The My Hero Academia manga and anime series feature a vast world with an extensive cast of characters created by Kōhei Horikoshi. The series takes place in a fictional world where over 80% of the population possesses a superpower, commonly referred to as a "Quirk". The advent of these abilities has given rise to not only pro heroes but also the threat of villains.

U.A. High School students
 is a top ranking hero academy and considered as a prestigious high school for hero training in Japan. It is at the top of a forested hill in Musutafu, Japan. There are four courses that the students can study in core subjects, which includes: Hero, General, Support and Management Course. Students who did not make the cut in the Hero Course are included in the General Course. However, they can still be transferred by scoring a possible passing grade through hero instructors, after an opportunity to gain attention during the Sports Festival. As stated by the Class 1-A homeroom teacher Shota Aizawa, U.A. does not adhere to traditional school methods, and allows their faculty staff to teach their classes however they like. This includes teachers having the authority to expel any students and for any reason, no matter how minor. students who are expelled can be re-enrolled, although the expulsion will remain on their permanent records.

Class 1-A students
  / 

 
 The main protagonist of the series, Izuku is a timid, selfless, and Quirkless teenage boy who dreams of becoming a superhero. He is initially portrayed as insecure, tearful, vulnerable, and non-expressive due to yeаrs of being looked down on Bakugo for lacking a Quirk. He is quite diligent and strong-willed student, being extremely (and sometimes scarily) enthusiastic about topics related to heroes. His dream drives him to write notes about everything he learns to regard heroes' Quirks and fighting capabilities. Thanks to this practice, Izuku has developed a great analytical mind and can form complex battle plans in a few seconds, factoring in the best ways he can use the Quirks of allies and enemies alike for his own advantage. He helps or lecture people with personal and emotional problems, regardless if it is his business or not, claiming that a hero should meddle in other people's lives. He externalizes his observations through endless mumbling, a habit that annoys or creeps out his peers including All Might. He has a strong fascination with heroes and is shown well-versed in their history, sometimes even surprising the heroes themselves with his vast knowledge. Eventually, Izuku becomes the first user to manifest a psychic link with the spirits of past One For All users as well as inherit their Quirks. After nearly a year of school activities and internships, some of which are intercepted by villain attacks, Izuku learns that All for One's apprentice Tomura Shigaraki has become powerful enough to steal One for All. Due to this, Izuku decides to leave U.A. so he can combat Shigaraki and his army of villains without endangering his classmates, who he had informed about his leave. Prior to leaving, he informs his classmates and several of the top heroes about One for All, the latter of whom assist him in hunting down the villains.

  /  / 

 
The Ultra Analysis guidebook was revealed that Bakugo described his personality as an "abusive egotist". Katsuki is a crude, arrogant, short-tempered, and aggressive person, especially at the beginning of the series. Because of his Quirk and talents, Katsuki is very confident and brave to where he will go against anyone who challenges him. He never backs down from a fight and will go out when facing such a powerful opponent. Because of having been excessively praised by his peers as a child for his strong Quirk and natural-born talent, Bakugo became very egotistical and disrespectful, especially towards Izuku. Both characters share a sensitive history with each other, with Katsuki being unable to overcome his issues with Izuku, although this has not stopped them from working together many times especially in Final Exams Arc. He prefers to self-reflect in silence and solitude, becoming a bit more brooding during those periods. His unchecked pride and aggression cost him victories frequently, like the Battle Trial or the Provisional Hero License Exam, and it worsens whenever Izuku is involved. Despite having bullied Izuku ever since they were kids, over the course of the series, he grows to care for Izuku's well-being, especially after learning the truth about One For All. After Izuku leaves U.A. to keep his friends and family safe from All For One, Bakugo finally mends his relationship with the former by apologizing to him for his arrogant behavior over the years and calling him by his real name.

  / 
 
 A bubbly and kind-hearted girl whose Quirk  enables her to make any object weightless by touching them with the pads on her fingertips. Overuse of her Quirk will cause her to suffer from severe nausea. The author Horikoshi describes Ochaco as "honest". In a prototype concept made by Horikoshi, Ochaco was originally named "Yu Takeyama" which is the full name of Mt. Lady, as well as the Quirk herself. However, this was scrapped because Horikoshi thought that it would have made her too overpowered than the protagonists and that would also be made her too troublesome to handle. Ochaco was described as "the most laid back girl" among her class. She is often incredibly blunt without being aware of it. She often becomes amused at certain personality traits and quirks others exhibit, bursting into laughter, which she tries to suppress. Ochaco is the one whom inspiring and embraces Izuku's hero name and saying that "Deku" sounds similar to "dekiru" (出来る), which roughly translates to "[you] can do it". She is a very warm individual who thinks about everything positively, though she is objective enough to see flaws and virtues. She is empathetically friendly to those she meets, and will try to help or defend anyone who is kind to her or who needs help. Despite her usually cheery and sometimes ditzy demeanor, Ochaco can take on an extremely determined, focused, and somewhat intimidating attitude when the situation calls for it. She has a crush on Izuku, but keeps it private to focus on her goal to become a hero in order to provide for her parents. Unlike all of her classmates who are using smartphones, Ochaco still owns a flip-phone for being a poor household. In terms of heroism, Ochaco has shown more preference towards rescue, being a fan of Thirteen for her expertise in the area. She is aware of her physical limitations, deciding to choose the combat-oriented hero Gunhead for her internship in order to increase her fighting repertoire. she developed a new sense of battle awareness and has become a more instinctive fighter. After her classmates successfully bring Izuku back to U.A., when the civilians begin to protest about forcing to pay the price for the heroes' mistakes, Ochaco pleads the crowd with her speech and convinced them to let Izuku rest because Heroes deserved to be saved too.

  / 
 
 The straight-laced president of Class 1-A whose Quirk  gives him super speed and superhuman kicking strength via jet engines in his calves. Horikoshi mentions in the first volume that Tenya was created during the serialization meeting and that the character ended up deviating from the original concept (possibly because of the setting being changed to a school one), which may explain the disparity between the older and hardly resembled the current character and the design in which it is much slimmer and not as tall or muscular. Tenya may look severe, unfriendly, and even intimidating at first glance, but he is actually a straightforward, earnest, intelligent, sophisticated, disciplined, and noble person, although clueless about personal interactions because of his elite upbringing. He takes everything seriously and is known for his habit of jumping to conclusions, then enthusiastically speaking or acting based on said conclusions; for example, after Izuku had figured out the true nature during the Entrance Exam, Tenya acknowledged him as a worthy peer and has since held him in high esteem. As Class 1-A's president, Tenya is obsessed with organization and discipline, expecting his classmates to follow suit, which more often than not annoys them because of his loud and overbearing nature. He is very humble, willing to admit to his mistakes, apologize for rude behavior, and improve himself in areas he is lacking. Being part of the highly esteemed Ida Family, Tenya is proud of his lineage and works hard to meet the expectations placed upon him. He admires his older brother Tensei, and aspires to become a hero similar to him. After his older brother Tensei was forced to retire because of being critically injured by the Hero Killer Stain, Tenya takes up his brother's mantle after much contemplation.

  / 
 
 
 An aloof and composed student in Class 1-A. His Quirk  enables him to generate ice from the right side of his body and fire from the left. He is one student in U.A. High School that got an application through Recommendation Entrance Exam. Shoto was originally a cold, aloof personality, which stemmed from his abusive upbringing and complicated family life. Focused and unemotional, Shoto preferred to keep to himself instead of hanging out with other people. He is the youngest child of Endeavor and because of the harsh abuse that he suffered from his father growing up; he refused to use his left side for years until Izuku made him understand that using his fire powers does not mean that he has to accept his heritage. After the events of the U.A. Sports Festival, however, Shoto notably became more sociable and kind, even gaining a sense of humor and occasionally smiling, although still keeping some fragments of his previous distant attitude. He goes to visit his mother Rei Todoroki in the hospital, although the two felt awkward because of how much time they spent apart. He remains relatively cold towards Endeavor and has clarified that forgiveness for his past treatment of him and his mother is difficult, but has showed worry pertaining to his father's safety. Ever since his father tried to repair his relationship with his family, Shoto has taken a cautious, yet hopeful approach to the development.

  / 
 
 A boisterous and chivalrous student in Class 1-A whose Quirk  enables him to harden his body. However, there is a limit to how much damage his hardened body can withstand, which causes the Hardening itself to slowly dissipate, and to lose stamina from keeping his Quirk active. Eijiro has a fondness for a concept of manliness, often using the terms "manly" and "unmanly" to describe things and people he does or does not like, respectively. He is determined and selfless, bravely putting the safety of others before himself. Thanks to his respectful and encouraging attitude, he can make friends with most people he encounters, particularly those that show as much passion and resolve as he does. Loyal and dedicated to his friends, Eijiro will break laws and rules in order to help or save them, becoming regretful if he becomes unable to come for their aid. He has a strong sense of responsibility, sometimes being very hard on himself for any negative outcomes that befall him or his friends. In his young days, Kirishima trying to be a hero with his less developed hardening Quirk, but for facing against actual villains, he needed a boost in order to truly pursue his heroic dreams. Before he enroll to U.A. High, he has known Ashido since their middle school days, where he tried to stop students from getting bullied. He was also hesitate to save some of his classmates when a mysterious villain threatens them. He has no choice if he wanted to be a hero anymore, but he was once again lifted thanks to a speech from his favorite hero, Crimson Riot.

  / 
 
 An overly sincere frog-like girl in Class 1-A. Her Quirk  gives her abilities such as enhanced swimming and jumping, sticking to and climbing up walls, and a long prehensile tongue. Tsuyu was originally going to be a male character, but Horikoshi makes a character female because of the lack of Class 1-A's girls. She is a straightforward and aloof individual who always speaks bluntly from her mind and what she thinks about others. She prefers to be called "Tsu", but only by people she views as friends. Her usual expression comprises a vacant stare, which makes reading her thoughts and emotions difficult for those around her while also creeping them out. Tsuyu has a habit of tipping her finger against her mouth while speaking, pondering, or showing curiosity. She says "ribbit" ("kero" in Japanese), emulating a frog's croaking at the end of her sentences, or as a replacement for many of her single word replies. When several members of Class 1-A agreed to rescue Katsuki Bakugo after the Vanguard Action Squad Invasion, Tsuyu was the most outspoken against it, asserting that acting on their emotions and breaking the law to rescue him made them essentially the same as villains. She rarely has emotional feelings outside of dorms, telling the Bakugo Rescue Squad to settle things right and go back to have a fun again after they went off to save their classmate out of selfishness; the friends apologize to her afterwards.

  / 
 
 The mature and levelheaded vice president of Class 1-A. Her Quirk  allows her to create any non-biological object from the lipids stored in her body as long as she knows its molecular structure. Horikoshi clarifies that Momo cannot create living beings, correcting a previous statement claimed Momo could not produce organic material. Her Quirk was originally would belong to a Pro Hero, but Horikoshi thought that such an overpowered ability would be more interesting if handled by an inexperienced character. She is one student to apply in U.A. High School through official recommendations. Momo is a very prudent, dedicated person who acts as a natural leader. She is very kind and polite, and quite reserved, yet she can be blunt with her comments about people's mistakes and miscalculations, being very direct and wishing to help her peers improve enough to become great heroes, such as when she tutored her classmates at her home. While originally confident in herself, Momo's pride was crushed after her rapid loss to Fumikage Tokoyami in the U.A. Sports Festival and the comparisons she made between Shoto Todoroki and herself, losing confidence in her own ability to make quick choices on practical situations. However, thanks to Shoto's encouragement on their final exams, Momo regained confidence in her quick-thinking, learning that people have different skills and can sometimes complement each other.

  / 
 
 A diminutive, cowardly, and lecherous boy whose Quirk  grows many small, highly adhesive grape-like balls on his head that he can remove and use as weapons. He can also use the balls as his personal trampolines, as they bounce off his body instead of sticking to him. Overuse of his Quirk will cause his scalp to bleed. The character's concept was conceived early. Horikoshi had trouble balancing Minoru's likeability with his perversion. He enjoys drawing Minoru, viewing a bit of himself in him. Minoru can be very hypocritical, criticizing others for perceived perverted behavior, even if they turn out to be nothing more than misunderstandings. He easily freaks out in moments of great stress or fear, acting impulsively, crying when the situation does not look favorable and abusing his Quirk recklessly, to the point of hurting himself. He is also not a very confident fighter and may attempt to flee in highly disadvantageous situations whenever the opportunity presents itself. Minoru is intelligent, able to score very high on tests, and being in the top half of Class 1-A's grades, despite being considered as a slacker by most of the class. He is mostly disliked by the girls of Class 1-A for his perverted tendencies, which have annoyed even Eraser Head.

  / 
 
 A flirty, laid-back and friendly boy whose Quirk  allows him to absorb and emit electricity. Overuse of this Quirk will cause his brain to "short circuit", reducing him into a giggling idiot for some time. In this state, he always giving thumbs-ups to let others know he is fine. Horikoshi thinks Denki is fun to draw, but then he struggles to draw his hair with consistency. Aside from being friendly, Denki is a social and energetic boy who likes to hang out with other people. He is rather casual when interacting with others, including the unfriendly Katsuki Bakugo, although he is also not above petty complaining or overreacting if feeling annoyed or shocked enough. He may appear blunt and reckless, but is always well-meaning. Denki is flirtatious towards the girls, both in and out of his school class, sometimes accompanying Minoru Mineta on his schemes and trying to pass himself off as a smooth talker. He does not appear to pay attention in classes, gets easily bored from lectures, and suffers anxiety attacks when dealing with tests, at which point he becomes increasingly agitated and aggressive especially in Finals Exam where he has a lack of academic performance to written exam. During combat, he is quick to panic and may accidentally activate his Quirk in the face of any imminent danger, leaving himself vulnerable. He becomes more reluctant to use his full power when there are allies close to him, being afraid of hurting them through collateral damage from his volatile bolts. When he is assured that his allies are safe from his powers, he becomes more confident in his fighting abilities. During the Paranormal Liberation War, Denki gained a scar on his upper left forehead following his injury from Mr. Compress' attack, although his hair covers it rather well.

  / 
 ; Chrissy Costanza (singing, both languages)
 A pragmatic and music-loving girl in Class 1-A whose Quirk  allows her to plug her extremely long earlobes into objects to hear minuscule sounds and vibrations from her surroundings or channel the sound of her own heartbeat as sonic attacks. Horikoshi stated that Kyoka may have been the first character he came up with. He was inspired to make a character that could plug their ears into objects while listening to music on his earphones during a trip back home. Aside from being pragmatic, Kyoka has an unenthusiastic and teasing personality that is mostly shown to those she finds irritating, like her classmate Denki Kaminari, whose cluelessness makes him an easy target for her snarky comments. She is not always like this though, as she enjoys socializing with others, in which case she is usually nice and friendly. Kyoka often gesticulates through her elongated earlobes in place of her hands. She can also be quite aggressive, evidenced when she uses the Earphone Jacks her Quirk provides to physically punish people when provoked or to keep them in line, most notably Denki and Minoru Mineta. Despite she has a cold and indifferent personality, Kyoka also has a much more sensitive side, being very defensive towards her friends, empathetic with others' feelings, and getting flustered when her talents and capabilities are brought up. Like her parents, Kyoka has a major interest in rock music and owns several instruments which she can play to some extent. However, she seemed to be embarrassed about her interests initially, because she perceived them as completely unrelated to heroism, but thanks to a great presentation during the U.A. School Festival, she could outgrow that mindset.

  / 
 
 A stoic crow-headed student in 1-A whose Quirk  allows him to manifest and control a sentient shadow monster from his body that grows more powerful in the dark. Horikoshi considered him as outstanding, although the author notes this is not the general opinion in the world of My Hero Academia. Like the other characters, Fumikage is the hard one to draw in which the author struggles to do so. Fumikage is reserved, serious, and focused, albeit noble and valiant as well. Though he does not talk very much, he was directly ignoring some questions or requests that seem pointless while he talks to other people as some sort of ongoing joke. When he teams up with others, he becomes more sociable; helping his teammates out, reassuring his trust in them, and thanked them for their effort. During combat, Fumikage is fierce and dependable, with his strength and capabilities rarely being questioned. During his internship, Fumikage describes how Hawks essentially resolves everything by himself where he doubts his ability to become a hero. But thanks to Hawks, his new ability seems to improve which carried over to the Joint Training Battle. While he is initially quiet, and sometimes timid in the face of dangerous situations (such as when he believed the Pro Heroes should rescue Katsuki after his capture), he later proves himself to be a confident, brave young man worthy of the hero title when he risks his life to save Hawks at the hands of Dabi. The guidebook reveals that Fumikage's choker is worn in honor of a Pro Hero he idolizes, Dark Crystal.

  / 
 
 An upbeat and easygoing girl with pink skin, black eyes, and horns in Class 1-A whose Quirk  allows her to secrete an acidic fluid from her body. She can also control the levels of solubility and viscosity of her acid. Besides her Quirk handling, Mina has the best reflexes out of all of Class 1-A's female students, and most of the overall students in the said class. Being highly social and excitable, Mina loves to hang out with her friends and is shown to become very upset when denied an opportunity to be at a gathering. She possesses a strong fashion sense and likes to go shopping. Her academic performance is quite poor, with Mina goofily laughing about it despite showing clear anxiety and frustration on the inside. However, she can show dedication to her studies as long as she gets proper tutoring. Because of her athleticism and energy, Mina enjoys and is very skilled at dancing. Her demeanor becomes more strict and perfectionist when teaching others how to dance, in direct contrast to her usual happy-go-lucky nature. She has known Kirishima since their middle school days and enjoys teasing Uraraka over her romantic feelings towards Izuku. According to the Ultra Analysis guidebook, Mina has "never liked anyone, but wishes she can be in love".

  / 
 
 A flamboyant boy whose Quirk  allows him to fire a laser blast from his belly button. His Quirk was inspired by the X-Men member Cyclops. Yuga is the only Class 1-A student to be born outside Japan. Horikoshi does not really understand about the character, but still he is fine with him and he makes fun to draw. Yuga initially appears to be a vain and prideful person, thinking of himself as superior to the rest of his classmates, especially regarding his Quirk. His expression rarely changes from a closed smile, even while he speaks or gets hurt, and he's also prone to getting upset if interrupted or questioned. Yuga's sentences often end with a star (☆) symbol, showing a fancy tone. He also plays up his French heritage, occasionally implementing French words into his sentences. However, this persona is a façade, as he holds severe insecurities and guilt because of the true nature of his Quirk and upbringing. As the overuse of his Quirk causes him stomach pains, Yuga feels a sense of kinship with Izuku because of having a similar issue with his Quirk. He has always related to Izuku in this sense, and simply wanted to get to know him better. However, it also eliminates any possibility that Yuga did this out of malice. After Izuku thank him for a surprise last night, the two become good friends with Mina, noting Yuga's more cheerful attitude. Yuga is later revealed to be born Quirkless before acquiring his Quirk by his parents making a deal with All For One while he was forced to serve as the villain's spy within U.A. out of fear of his parents' safety.

  / 
 
 A masked student whose Quirk  allows him to grow individual body organs at the tips of the four webbed tentacles growing from his shoulders. Despite his frightening appearance, Mezo is a friendly and gentle person who works nicely with anyone. Having been bullied as a child for appearance because of his hometown being prejudiced against those whose Quirks make them monstrous, wearing a mask to not make children cry, Mezo found pride in his body when he saved a girl and was inspired by the event to become a hero to fight all forms of prejudice. He is not the type to hold grudges, showing no ill will towards those that harm him unwillingly. He is quite selfless and willing to risk his life for anyone. He can be empathetic and understanding, but still shows a sense of maturity and responsibility that prevents himself from acting under emotional impulses, even if he feels regretful about it. He is very protective of his classmates, especially if they are hurt or injured. The guidebook states that his feelings for his friends are stronger than anyone else and he does not mind sacrificing himself.

  / 
 
 A sociable and humorous boy whose Quirk  allows him to shoot cellophane tape from the tape dispenser-like organs on his elbows. Hanta's abilities are like Marvel Comics hero Spider-Man, with Hanta's tape being used for similar purposes as Spider-Man's webs, such as swinging through buildings and restraining enemies. The guidebook acknowledges the connection between them by stating that Hanta has a deep admiration for "someone" that its Spider-Man's description. Although he is just a background character, Horikoshi likes him enough to consider more prominent roles. He came up with his Quirk, and thus his character, during a trip to a convenience store. He notes that Hanta's Quirk is his favorite. Hanta is often the only person to call his classmates out when they are acting crazy. He is quite humorous and often takes part in making jokes with his classmates. However, when push comes to shove, Hanta is a brave hero-in-training who wishes to prosper on his own while helping others do the same. He makes friends with those around him and is a very laid-back guy. Though not openly flirtatious like Denki or Minoru, Hanta still possesses some interest in girls especially in the Provisional License Exam when Izuku informs him of the girl who transformed into a clone of Ochaco, he starts violently shaking Izuku and asking him if she was naked as well.

  / 
 
 A humble and honest student whose Quirk  grants him a thick prehensile tail. Horikoshi explains how people like Mashirao, who possess mutant appendages, can order custom-made clothing that suit their needs. Mashirao has a very calm and noble attitude, as well as a deep sense of dignity, which prevents him from accepting results he does not feel like he earned with his own abilities. He is also described as a hard worker. Before Izuku's fight against Hitoshi Shinso in the Sports Festival event, Mashirao told Izuku to avoid talking to Hitoshi because of a brainwashing ability which can ask questions and respond to what Hitoshi said. Along with a strong sense of dignity, Mashirao can be described as sheepish and bashful, not very often enjoying the spotlight and being easily embarrassed. He is shocked easily, such as when he saw Ochaco punch herself in the face during the Joint Training Arc, as well as when Eri received a sword that is much bigger than her during Class 1-A's Christmas party.

  / 
 
 A shy and quiet student with rock-like skin whose Quirk  allows him to talk to animals. With his Quirk, Koda can interact with them in ways that others cannot. Because of his shyness, Koda rarely speaks, and prefers to use sign language to converse with his classmates. Horikoshi likes his non-human character design. Koda is the only Class 1-A student to have a pet; a rabbit named "Yuwai-chan", also dubbed "Kawaii-chan" by his female classmates. He appears to enjoy the company of animals, even owning a small rabbit as a pet. He also owns a few animal dolls and decorations in his room, implying he likes cute things. In the First Term Final Exam, Koda suffers from entomophobia, being deathly afraid of insects, with the mere sight of them making him scream and run away in fear. However, he can put his fear aside if it means helping his comrades, as it was shown during the Joint Training Arc when he attempted to use bugs alongside Eijiro, to take down Jurota Shishida.

  / 
 
 A sweet-loving student whose Quirk  enhances his physical strength at the cost of his cognitive functions whenever he consumes sugar. For every additional 10 grams of sugar he ingests, he extends the time of increased strength by another three minutes. Horikoshi wanted to show his Quirk earlier, deeming it as "very strong". Because his Quirk needs sugar to work, Sato is a very talented baker. He was surprised by the overly positive reaction suggests that he himself does not think much of his own abilities as a confectioner. in every week in the dorms, he bakes sweets and shares them with his classmates, which he calls "Sugar Time". He pairs his sweets with Momo Yaoyorozu's tea to create a gourmet night. He can also cook other food too, as shown during the Christmas party. The guidebook reveals he has daily tea meetings with Momo.

  / 
 
 A cheery and outgoing girl in Class 1-A whose Quirk  makes her entire body invisible and gives her the ability to refract light. Because of her Quirk, her features have only been partially revealed in-series and her hero uniform consists solely of a pair of gloves and boots in order to maximize her stealthiness. Like Tsuyu Asui, Toru was supposed to be a male character but Horikoshi changes the character into female because of the time that there are lacking of Class 1-A's girls; it is also because the author thought that a girl with an invisible body would be a funnier concept in the series. She described her face as "a combination of Yang Guifei and Francis Xavier". Toru is socially eager and appears to like shopping. Her room suggests that she likes plushies and other cute things. In the battle, she believes that taking off her clothes is a tactical advantage, much to the awkwardness of those around her. She seems to be blissfully unaware of what it means to be invisible, such as displaying slight embarrassment at the idea of being seen undressing, a trait that shows up even when she's wearing her hero costume, which features almost no clothing. During the U.A. Traitor Arc, Toru has an observant side to her as she noticed Yuga had not been his usual self after Izuku Midoriya's return to U.A. and her curiosity led to her discovering that he was a traitor who had (albeit painfully and unwillingly) given intel to All For One. She also showed to be emotionally fragile as, after reprimanding Yuga for having betrayed his classmates, she was shown crying about how he had the gall to attend classes with them. She was still crying afterwards and sobbed on Mashirao's shoulder during Yuga's interrogation.

Class 1-B students
  / 
 
 A boastful student whose Quirk  allows him to temporarily duplicate and use another person's Quirk by simply touching them. He can store four Quirks, but can only activate one at a time. However, he cannot effectively use copied Quirks that require a previously stored resource such as One For All, Fat Absorption and Rewind. The author Horikoshi revealed that he had based Neito on a real person. The character was later revealed he was inspired by Dane DeHaan's performance as Harry Osborn/Green Goblin in The Amazing Spider-Man 2 film. For unknown reasons, he harbors an intense dislike of Class 1-A and occasionally comes up with plans for him or his class to upstage them. He has an inferiority complex, likely stemming from being told his Quirk was that of a villain's since he was young, as "heroes don't steal Quirks". His manner of speaking is like that of Seiji Shishikura, as he uses more eloquent words than strictly necessary, especially when he's addressing the students of Class 1-A, as shown in the Joint Training Arc. Even with his impressive tactical and analytical skills, one of his understated weaknesses is his poor aptitude in school works and studying, failing the Summer written exams, being forced to take part in the remedial lessons during the Quirk Training Camp, and only barely passing the Fall written exams.

  / 
 
 The spirited and sensible president of Class 1-B whose Quirk  allows her to enlarge her fists. Her Quirk was inspired by the Kamala Khan version of Ms. Marvel. Although the characters' debut appearances seems to be closer Itsuka may be drawn an inspiration from another Marvel hero Mister Fantastic, a founding member of the Fantastic Four whom has the same powers as Kamala Khan. Itsuka is friendly to people outside her class and seems to hold no signs of ill-will towards Class 1-A, making her a minority of the 1-B students. She is usually the one who keeps Monoma in check whenever his antics get out of line. Itsuka has displayed sympathy towards others, even if she is far from them. She showed concern for Izuku Midoriya and Tenya Ida after hearing about their run-in with Stain and helped Class 1-A by telling them what was supposed to be on the First Term Final Exam's practical portion despite it being against the rules. She and Yaoyorozu have to develop a friendly rivalry relationship.

  / 
 
 A highly religious girl whose Quirk  gives her a head of vines instead of hair that she can extend and use in combat. She was originally planned to be in Class 1-A. In an interview, Horikoshi stated that Ibara's hair was the hard one to draw. Ibara is a very modest and courteous person, whom first makes her humility clear after Present Mic calls her an assassin. Although graceful and soft-spoken, she is not afraid to make her pure intentions known. She seems to be of a highly religious inclination, because of her talking about heaven and divine beings in passing on multiple occasions, and her ultimate moves having somewhat religious names, such as "Faith's Shield" and "Crucifixion". She showed her gratitude after receiving a second chance to take part in the U.A. Sports Festival and made her aim to spread well across the world apparent before her fight with Denki. Denki referred to her as "acorn-eyed", a slang term for someone with large, dark eyes. Notably, the only person Ibara ever deceives is Minoru, both taking his headband deceitfully during the Sports Festival, and lying to lure him out during the Summer Training Camp.

  / 
 
 A fiery and outspoken student whose Quirk  allows him to turn his skin into steel. However, if he uses a Quirk for too long, he will suffer from iron fatigue, which result in his metal form to lose its durability. His Quirk is a reference to a junior version of X-Men member Colossus. Horikoshi said that he likes his design and wants to draw more of him. Tetsutetsu is confident, stubborn, and straightforward in his motivations and actions. He is very vocal about his intentions and has a one-track mind, often looking for the simplest solution to problems in order to solve them in the most direct manner. He appeared to care deeply about his peers. He and Kirishima eventually develop a friendly rivalry because of the similarity of their Quirks. During battles, Tetsutetsu's direct personality shows through his tenacious and upfront fighting style. He did not attack the villains before ensuring Ibara Shiozaki's safety and did not hesitate to throw himself in front of a bullet for Itsuka Kendo.

  / 
 
 A skull-faced boy whose Quirk  enables him to soften anything that he touches. Juzo is one of the U.A. students to apply through Recommendation Entrance Exam. He hates losing; however, like the rest of his class, he does not feel bad about letting others receive what they deserve as shown when he let his classmates continue at the Sports Festival. He is also shown to have a calm, understanding demeanor when dealing with his classmates' antics, notably during the Joint Training Battle. When Tenya activates his Recipro Turbo, Juzo realized he was at a grave disadvantage and retreats, showing his good judgment towards fight or flight.

  / 
 
 A humble and apologetic boy whose Quirk  allows him to, at the site of an initial impact, create a second impact, which he can activate anytime. Along with Ibara, Nirengeki was originally planned to be in Class 1-A. As the vice president of Class 1-B, it can be suggested that his classmates trust him and find him reliable. He is described as Class 1-B's conscience, and shows to be more amicable and less competitive than some of his other classmates. In battle, he is focused and collaborates well with others, as he worked in unison with Reiko Yanagi and Yui Kodai, displaying a good sense of teamwork. He also complimented Mina Ashido on her uppercut afterwards, implying that he is mature and does not hold grudges.

  / 
 
 A boy whose Quirk  allows him to physically connect anything he contacts. Although he is not as social as some others, Yosetsu is foul-mouthed and tense, except for serious or life-or-death situations, in which he becomes easily startled and much more talkative, although he keeps his harsh way of speech. He is very selfless, as he continued to carry Momo Yaoyorozu even though the Chainsaw Nomu was catching up with him, refusing to leave her behind despite her slowing him down. He is also willing to put himself in danger to fulfill a plan, despite showing fear. It reveals that he has a crush on Momo. in preparing School Festival. Since Itsuka was busy for Beauty Contest, Yosetsu is the one to knock out Neito Monoma for mocking Izuku and Class 1-A yet again. He apologizes to Izuku, Eri and Mirio Togata for Neito's behavior afterwards.

  / 
 
 A boy whose Quirk  enables him to solidify air into a wall or platform. Kosei is a very enthusiastic and competitive individual who holds himself to a high standard as he attempts to avoid descending to the level of his rivals. However, Kosei was not above taunting Katsuki Bakugo himself after stopping the Class 1-A student with his Quirk. Similar to Neito Monoma, Kosei has no problem settling for less rather than aiming for the top. While Kosei is not the sort to attack offensively, he is described as a great backup player who uses his Quirk to aid others. Kosei reveals he likes any kind of live-action television that features superheroes and considerably uses special effects.

  / 
 
 A student whose Quirk  allows him to rotate any part of his body at incredibly high speeds, similar to a drill. Sen is a level-headed student who remains calm and focused frequently. He is also more mature than Neito Monoma, telling the latter to quit provoking Katsuki Bakugo and focus on his goal during the Cavalry Battle. Despite his serious demeanor, Sen can sometimes warm up when he drops his solemn behavior, such as when he shows enthusiasm in fighting against Mashirao Ojiro during the Joint Training Arc. He is also rather belligerent in terms of personality and often gets dragged along in his friends' antics. Sen is also described as an "ikeman", appearing to be a good-looking man.

  / 
 
 A tall boy made of rubber whose Quirk  enables him to excrete a glue-like liquid from seven "eyeholes" on his glue dispenser-shaped head. Described as a gentle giant, Kojiro has been a "shrinking violet" compared to the rest of his classmates, similar to Koji Koda from Class 1-A. He often stammers when speaking with his teammates during the Joint Training Arc, but despite this, Kojiro is an easygoing guy as he seems to get along well with his classmates, even the quiet Yui Kodai.

  / 
 
 A mysterious girl whose Quirk  grants her the ability to telekinetically manipulate objects around her. Her hero name is a pop culture reference to the American horror/drama film The Exorcism of Emily Rose. Reiko is a quiet and emotionless teenager who often shows an odd body posture, wherein she keeps her elbows to her side and lets her hands dangle, which somewhat resembles ancient depictions of zombies, ghosts, and other undead creatures, alluding to her Quirk. She can also be quite verbose with her wording, as she referred to Izuku Midoriya as "spooky", causing her classmates to simplify what she says to those not familiar with her. Reiko revealed she likes searching in the internet about spooky stories.

  / 
 
 A tall student whose Quirk  grants him the ability to transform into a monstrous beast. Jurota seems to be an intellectual, as he uses a fairly verbose way of speaking and often addresses others by respectful titles such as 'sir' and 'miss'. This is because he was brought up in a very well mannered and doting family. While transformed, however, Jurota is rather boisterous and energetic, which is likely a side effect of his Quirk. He admires Hound Dog and wishes he could throw everything away like he does, but cannot because of his upbringing. He is the reference of X-Men member Henry Philip "Hank" McCoy/Beast.

  / 
 
 A quiet and unexpressive girl whose Quirk  enables her to change the size of any object she interacts with. In the early sketches drawn by Horikoshi, a prototype concept about Ochaco's original name and Quirk are initially created in different designs where she was drawn with U.A. school uniform and hair similar to that of Yui. Despite her silent demeanor, Yui is shown to care about her classmates during the Forest Training Camp Arc, when she looks after Juzo Honenuki and Ibara Shiozaki after they get knocked unconscious by Mustard's poisonous gas. Yui revealed she was unaware of a group of boys formed a fan club for her during her middle school years, even after she graduated.

  / 
 
 A boy from China whose Quirk  enables him to form scales on his body for combat and other purposes. He can also shoot the scales. Hiryu will work with others as shown during the obstacle course when he suggested for everyone to use their Quirks together, in order to clear the way through the fallen 0-point robots. He possesses a serious demeanor for playing out his abilities into action. He is rather diligent in terms of academic abilities and Quirk functions as well. He reveals about disliking winter since his Quirk makes it hard to keep himself warm.

  / 
 
 A girl whose Quirk  grants her the ability to create spores from her cells, allowing her to grow mushrooms from the surfaces of her surroundings. Her hero name was originally to be "Gnocchi Nyokonyoko", but that was changed because of being very difficult to pronounce. Her dream is to become an Idol Hero. In the Joint Training Battle, when her teammate Shihai Kuroiro's plan fails, Kinoko excitedly starts her part of the plan using her Mushroom Quirk, suggesting that her confidence has increased, or at least that she is more comfortable around mushrooms. However, after the battle, she was seen to have a kind side when she apologized to Fumikage Tokoyami for using her Quirk too much on him and telling him to take the medicine to better himself. She also seems to be a fan of Hawks and asked Fumikage if he had any pictures of the No. 2 Hero in his private life.

  / 
 
 A student with a mantis-shaped head whose Quirk  grants him the ability to produce large, sharp blades from all over his body. Horikoshi mentions that Togaru's design was influenced by Jean-Henri Fabre's Souvenirs entomologies and collected insects. Togaru is a hot-blooded person who appears rather aggressive in terms of behavior, akin to Katsuki Bakugo, albeit not to the same extent as the latter. He also seems to have a passion for fighting against his enemies, demonstrated by his desire to battle Class 1-A in the Joint Training Arc. Because of their similar personalities, Togaru views Katsuki as a personal rival.

  / 
 
 A timid girl from America whose Quirk  allows her to grow effectively gazelle-like horns on her head and control them. As a foreigner, Pony does not have much knowledge of the language in Japan. She is rather naïve and innocent in personality, learning nasty phrases from Neito Monoma without realizing what those words mean, as shown when Neito tells her unkind phrases to tell Class 1-A. When Pony gets angry or is thrown off by something, she speaks in English. She has a bond with Manga Fukidashi over their love of anime and manga together in which Pony view anime inside the dorms, and the rest of her classmates knew about anime and manga thanks to her.

  / 
 
 A girl whose Quirk  allows her to split her body into several pieces and control them telekinetically. She is one student of U.A. High School to apply through recommendations. Described as chatty, confident, and extremely provocative and talkative, Setsuna is one of the few students in Class 1-B that does not bear any apparent hatred to Class 1-A. She is a wily and thoughtful girl with great aptitudes toward leadership and cooperation. She is careful. Her attitude is different in combat and non-combat situations, having a more dirty and serious disposition when amid battle. Because of her strong personality and skills, Setsuna has total confidence in herself and her potential. She does not doubt or hesitate, appearing to be very strong-willed. Setsuna is noted to have been a gyaru in her middle school days.

  / 
 
 A cryptic and cunning boy whose Quirk  grants him the ability to merge into anything that is black-colored and control it. Shihai struggles to talk to girls and thinks they have a crush on him if they talk to him. The Ultra Analysis guidebook mentioned he has a crush on Kinoko. He is also seen standing jealously behind her while she talks to Fumikage. Due to he and Tokoyami's similar natures, they have developed a rivalry-friendship relationship.

  / 
 
 A student with a speech bubble for a head whose Quirk  allows him to manifest different onomatopoeias into reality as katakana. Overuse of his Quirk will cause him to suffer from a sore throat. Manga appears to be an expressive person, clear by his enthusiasm during the Cavalry Battle and Joint Training Session with Class 1-A. He also seems to have a soft spot for children as he enjoys making them smile. He was revealed that he has a crush on Class 3-G student, Bibimi Kenranzaki.

The Big 3
 are the third-year students who represent as the top hero candidates of U.A. High School, in terms of strength. They were introduced to Class 1-A by Shota Aizawa following the second term orientation. They are brought in to explain the Hero Work-Studies that students take part in on their own merit. They are widely known as the strongest three hero students in all of Japan. Thanks to Hero Work-Studies, the three of them have seasoned their skills and mastered their powerful Quirks at a young age. They are considered being above Pro Hero levels already and once they are graduated, they are determined to become Top Pro Heroes. Among its members are:

  / 
 
 A third-year student at U.A. and the leader of the Big 3. His Quirk  allows him to phase his body through anything solid, including the ground itself. According to Mirio, he chose the hero's name "Lemillion" because he wanted to help at least a million people. Horikoshi considers him as the easy character to draw, thanks to his simple facial features. Mirio appears goofy with a corny sense of humor, but is very loyal to the cause. He has a very optimistic attitude and can almost always be found smiling. His personality led Sir Nighteye to believe that he could be the one to replace All Might as the Symbol of Peace. He is also extremely brave and in contrast to his laid-back nature, he is experienced in dealing with dangerous people and is not easily scared. He could talk to Overhaul in his normal, cheerful manner despite knowing about his background as a dangerous yakuza member. Mirio is confident in his abilities during the battles. He could take down all of Class 1-A students to teach them a lesson and was even bold enough to face four of the Shie Hassaikai members alone. He loses his Quirk during the Shie Hassaikai Raid, but thanks to Eri, he eventually regains his powers and arrives just in time to help the other heroes in their battle with the Paranormal Liberation Front.

  / 
 
 A third-year student at U.A. whose Quirk  gives him the characteristics and abilities of anything he eats. Ironically, despite how talented he is with his Quirk, Amajiki suffers from social anxiety and has low self-esteem. According to Horikoshi, Tamaki's anxiety was inspired by his own experience when he attended the Jump Festa in 2017 and had to face an enormous crowd. Tamaki is extremely shy, aloof, depressed, "intimidating", and introverted, especially around big audiences. He gets nervous easily when talking to other people. He will often face away and lean into a wall to hide his face from others if the anxiety was involved. This also happens whenever Tamaki has a bad feeling or feels insulted. In his middle school days, Tamaki does not make any friends because of being considered as a boring person. But Mirio approached him after realizing that Tamaki was trying to say that he likes Heroes; the two began their friendship afterwards. Inspired by Mirio's bravery during the yakuza raid, Suneater shows a bright flash of courage, stepping up to the challenge of facing three villains alone so that the others can complete the mission. During the battle, Tamaki pushed himself to his limit so that he could uphold the expectations set on him by Fat Gum, Mirio, and others who believe in him. Tamaki voiced his disapproval of the way Toya Setsuno, Yu Hojo, and Soramitsu Tabe consider themselves expendable to Overhaul, but he appears to understand the bond between allies very well.

  / 
 
 A third-year student at U.A. whose Quirk  allows her to convert her stamina into energy and release it as spiral shockwaves. Overuse of her Quirk will suffer from exhaustion, causing to lose her own stamina. Horikoshi stated he has a hard time in drawing Nejire's long hair. Nejire is very enthusiastic, affable, and has an overzealously curious personality. She shows the compassionate side with Eri by doing her hair and playing with her on the free time. However, she has shown a more stoic nature during various situations; she was not very concerned for Tamaki when she learns of his attack. She also took part in Beauty Pageant during the U.A. School Festival, having defeated the first two times to Class 3-G's student Bibimi Kenranzaki, before winning in the third and final time. Despite her happy-go-lucky personality, Nejire is fierce in battle. When the situation calls for it, she can be very calm and focused. Her curiosity never seems to extend to the enemy, and she always maintains her focus on taking them down. During her battle against Tomura and High-Ends, Nejire showed great judgement, aptitude and anger, a side of which she rarely displays. Her strong heart has allowed her to climb the ranks into one of U.A.'s top three students.

Other students
 
 
 A creative first-year Support Course student from Class 1-H whose Quirk  allows her to zoom her vision to up to 5 kilometers. Mei was originally a male character but Horikoshi stated in the 35th chapter of the manga where he thought that it'd be more interesting if he made a character female, and the author changes it. Mei loves creating gadgets, which she refers to as her "super cute babies". She has a habit of "going straight to the point" and is very shameless and opportunistic for advertising her inventions. She is a genius inventor, although her creations are often shown to explode. Mei seems to be a little absent-minded as she is easily distracted and can sometimes be completely unaware of her surroundings, as shown by her inability to sense one of her inventions catch on fire as she was speaking with Izuku Midoriya. she seems inept at reading body language and social cues, apparently being oblivious to Izuku's discomfort with her proximity to him frequently. Mei's Power Suit invention was a reference to a prototype battle suit which was created by Justin Hammer, shown in the near the beginning of the Iron Man 2 film that twisted the torso section 180 degrees and probably killed the test pilot. This also happens on Izuku, but Mei disabled it before he got hurt.

 
 
 A first-year student from the General Course whose Quirk  allows him to control those who answer his questions. Hitoshi's purple hair and his mind abilities were inspired by the Marvel Comics supervillain Purple Man. At first, he has struggled with his Quirk in his entire life as it is a "villainous" Quirk despite his heroic intentions. Regardless of his drawbacks, however, Hitoshi desires to become a Pro Hero more than anything. Not only does he want to refute those who shame his abilities, but he also aspires to usurp students who walk the path towards becoming a Pro Hero, as he always wished to. While he stated he had no interest in making friends, Hitoshi has been surrounded by many students who see him as a friend, including Izuku, Denki Kaminari and Neito Monoma. After proving his potential to be a capable hero in the school festival, Hitoshi is taken as Eraser Head's apprentice. He trains for his fighting style but is struggling to develop the use of Capturing Weapon. However, after several months of training, he could use his ability properly, which shows his skill over Joint Training Battle. Eventually, he earns the right to transfer to the Hero Course for his second year.

Pro Heroes
The  are the individuals who are licensed to use their Quirks in order to protect the civilians and save the world from the villains, natural disasters, and/or any other kind of harm. In around the globe, the overall hero activity was managed by the World Heroes Association.

In order to become a Pro Hero, the students in U.A. High School must work as the sidekicks through Hero Agencies during the internships. The students can also take part of the Hero-Work Studies under the guidance of a Pro Hero, and the permission to fight the villains in emergency situations by obtaining the Provisional Hero License where they need to pass the exam.

In the aftermath of the Paranormal Liberation War, some of the Pro Heroes have retired due to an excessive criticism from the public especially where they vandalized by the anti-hero protestors, causing the number of Heroes in Japan to decrease.

Top Heroes
  / 
 
 A hotheaded and stern hero whose Quirk  gives him powerful pyrokinetic abilities. He is immune to other flames, and can easily control the shape and temperature of the blaze as well. As a Pro Hero, Enji is depicted as confident, reliable, and imposing, thanks to his excellent track record of solved cases. His rude and aggressive personality is well-known to the public, with his fans thinking of them as a selling point while others are scared by his overall violent attitude. His obsessive drive to surpass All Might in terms of strength and power has followed Enji throughout his entire life, with repeated failure having plagued him since his youth. Dedicated to his studies and hero work, Enji strived to become the absolute strongest Pro Hero in the country, but the figure of All Might proved itself too much of an insurmountable obstacle for him or anyone else to overcome, leaving Enji in a growing state of despair as he became more and more aware that closing the gap between him and the Symbol of Peace was futile. Even though he disliked his longtime rival All Might, Enji still respected his power and feats as the No. 1 Hero, to the point of not believing that the "real" All Might was a sick and weak-looking man. He is also the father of Shoto and his three older siblings, and the husband of Rei Himura. Enji has a strained relationship with his wife and children due to having projected his obsession of surpassing All Might on them, particularly on his sons Toya and Shoto. However, after becoming Japan's No. 1 hero following All Might's forced retirement, Enji starts to realize his mistakes and resolves to atone and make amends with his family.

  / 
 
 An affable, relaxed, and optimistic hero whose Quirk  grants him a pair of red feathered wings that allow him to fly at high speeds. He can also detach his feathers to use as blades or telekinetically control them from a distance. He is the first and also the highest-ranking Pro Hero to not attend the U.A. High School; instead the Hero Public Safety Commission decides to train him before he rises up to the top rankings among other Pro Heroes. During the interview on the Honyasan mobile app, Hawks' backstory was mentioned by the manga editor Yoritomi where it is based on the soccer player Lionel Messi's childhood life, and author Kōhei Horikoshi came up with this information which is used to develop the character. Keigo is shown to be highly intelligent, both emotionally and logistically. He promotes a carefree and jovial attitude, while his constant vigilance often hides under layers of serenity and equanimity. He follows the orders of the Hero Public Safety Commission without hesitation, but with subliminal cynicism. Nevertheless, Keigo dislikes formalities, often acting unpredictably while being cocky and taunting. On orders from the Hero Commission, Hawks infiltrates the Paranormal Liberation Front as a double agent and gains the trust of the villains within the organization, especially Twice. After he is outed as a double agent, Hawks is severely burned by Dabi but is later rescued by Tokoyami.

  / 
 
 A flamboyant and elegant hero whose Quirk  allows him to freely control fiber in clothes. He is the recipient of the "Best Jeanist" award for eight consecutive years. Tsunagu believes very strongly that people with influence must maintain a positive appearance both physically and socially. He often uses metaphors referencing jeans, denim, and various other sewing and fabric based phrases, often inspiring his recruits with speeches, telling them to keep their life straight like their jeans. During the internships, he admits to being unfond of brutish individuals like Katsuki Bakugo. He took on Katsuki in attempt to fix his attitude, only to be frustrated by the young man's stubbornness. He loses a lung in his brief battle with All For One and is seemingly killed by Hawks in order to gain the trust of the League of Villains. However, this is later revealed to be a ruse and Best Jeanist ultimately returns alive and well after Hawks is exposed as a double agent.

  / 
 
 A tough and aggressive heroine whose Quirk  gives her rabbit-like features such as superhuman leg strength and big rabbit-like ears. According to the 20th volume of the manga, Horikoshi noted that Rumi's hero name was inspired by the former professional mixed martial arts fighter Mirko "Cro Cop" Filipović. Rumi seems to believe that heroes who join teams are cowards, as they could just be relying on their teammates' strength rather than their own. As a Pro Hero, she proves to be very fearless and independent, freely traversing Japan while bravely facing any villain that she come across. The guidebook shows that she is only working alone, instead of working in the agency or be affiliated with some other institution. Despite her brash demeanor, Rumi is not above assisting others as she came to the aid of Endeavor and Hawks after seeing their battle with Hood on the news. She also request Endeavor's help while fighting a villain in one occasion, showing that she is not unwilling to ask for help from other heroes despite her solo disposition. During the Jaku Hospital Raid, she is heavily wounded by several High-End Nomus and ends up losing part of her right ear with her left forearm and right leg being replaced with interchangeable prosthesis after losing them.

 
 
 An emotional and noble hero whose Quirk  allows him to grow stone-like hexagon-shaped shields from his body. Described as his personality, Crust was crying out of sorrow for All Might's retirement and crying in regret for not being involved in the Kamino Incident. During the Jaku Hospital Raid, he saves Eraser Head's life at the cost of his own and is killed by the effects of Tomura Shigaraki's Quirk.

  / 
 
 A humble and gentle heroine who takes Nejire, Uraraka, and Tsuyu as her interns. Her Quirk  enables her to transform into a western dragon. Ryuko seems to have a soft spot for children, as shown by her caring and tutoring side towards her trainees. She was also saddened upon learning that Overhaul was using his own "daughter" to create Quirk-Destroying Drugs and made it clear to the other heroes that rescuing Eri should be their top priority. Her humble side is further highlighted when she considered herself the only one responsible for dropping to the tenth spot on the Japanese Hero Billboard Chart, and admitting that she could have done better after failing to save a civilian.

  / 
 
 The current No. 8 Pro Hero. His costume resembles a washing machine and leaves only his large eyes visible. He hires Koji and Manga for their internship. His Quirk  allows him to create and control soapy water from his body.

Faculty of U.A.
  / 
 
In drawing All Might, Horikoshi stating that the frontal shot of the character was extremely taxing due to being an excessive amount of shading present in his design. He was inspired by a combination of Superman and Captain America. All Might's habit of smiling was ingrained by his mentor, Nana Shimura, who believed that the ones who smile are the ones who are the strongest. Though he can be annoying at times, Toshinori is extremely friendly and amicable due to his popularity and years in the spotlight, always taking his time to interact with fans. During his time as a hero, the true details of All Might's Quirk were kept secret, to the point where it was one of the world's greatest mysteries. Whenever asked about it in interviews, he would simply tell a joke and dodge the question. He is very charismatic and has a fatherly attitude towards his students, especially Izuku. Also, much like Izuku, he was born Quirkless. He is considered to be a non-drinker, likely due to him lacking a stomach as well as health reasons related to his injury. Due to a crippling injury that he sustained from his first fight with All For One in the past, he ultimately selects Izuku as his successor. Similar to Steve Rogers where he passed his legacy to Sam Wilson, All Might did similarly to Izuku as well. Whenever he calls the student and speaking out loud or think to himself, he has a habit to adding "young" to the students with surname; for example, Young Midoriya. As a U.A. teacher, he can sometimes underestimate his students and is outsmarted as a result. Lacking teaching experience, he required a script in order to convey his first lesson to Class 1-A. He is also reprimanded on occasion by his fellow teacher, Eraser Head, for being sometimes unavailable for his teaching duties. However, All Might bringing his typical attitude into his teaching can be beneficial, creating an energetic and motivating environment. During the Final Exams Arc, out of all the teachers, he is the most ruthless so far. He can put on a theatrical villain one, doing it to bring out the full potential of others with rough love. His sheer intimidation alone was, according to Izuku, similar to that of Stain. When Katsuki stated that he would rather lose than seek Izuku's assistance, All Might was more than willing to force Katsuki to lose. He also punched Katsuki hard enough for him to vomit, showing he will not hold back and is willing to injure his student if that means they will pass the exams properly. After winning his rematch with All For One, All Might loses the ability to use One For All completely and dedicates himself to raising Izuku to eventually take his place as the world's greatest hero.

 
 
 A humanoid, mouse-headed animal who serves as the principal of U.A High. He is one of the few non-human animals in history to develop a Quirk. His Quirk  gives him anthropomorphic abilities and superhuman intelligence. Sometime before becoming U.A. High's principal, Nezu was experimented on by human beings. This mistreatment led to Nezu developing a sadistic side to his otherwise polite personality. He eventually became the principal of U.A. High and hired Shota Aizawa as a teacher, who asked the principal for the ability to expel and re-enroll students, feeling that they should know the difference between self-sacrifice and throwing one's life away, so that they strive higher. Nezu was unsure about Shota's proposition, but accepted it. As a result of abuse and mistreatment by humans in the past, Nezu's true character reveals itself whenever he is in combat. He enjoys "toying" with humans especially Denki Kaminari and Mina Ashido. He still holds a grudge over the many experiments he went through, coming off as slightly insane and unpredictable as a result. His dedication to educating goes as far as assessing villains, especially young ones, and wondering if they could be put on the right path if they were taught, although he admits the naivety of the idea. He is told about the secret of One For All by All Might, so Nezu suggested looking for a successor by giving him the opportunity to take up a teaching position at U.A. High.

  / 

 
 The pragmatic and lethargic homeroom teacher of Class 1-A. His Quirk  enables him to nullify another person's Quirk within his line of vision until he blinks. He can use his Quirk on multiple targets; it remains active, even if he looks elsewhere (as long as he does not blink). Because he suffers from dry eye and his Quirk tends to strain his eyes, Eraser Head is somewhat irritable and has a constantly tired appearance. Shota is loosely based on the DC Comics hero Batman, who also has the same theme to a character. Unlike the original Batman and Joker whom have clashing personalities and worldviews, he and Ms. Joke get along well and understand one another. He is a very stern and reserved man who has lofty expectations of his students. He often comes off as cold, apathetic, and impatient, exerting very little energy in most situations, preferring to take naps in his sleeping bag instead. As a teacher with notoriously high expectations, Shota is known to expel students who felt that they are not suited for U.A. High. However, it was revealed that the high expulsion rate is only on paper and that he actually re-enrolls the students he expels. When he and Izuku Midoriya first met, he had zero faith on Izuku's ability to become a hero. He preferred to him as a "problem child" due to Izuku's habit of causing trouble and getting himself into danger. Since then, he respected Izuku more often though he is still strict on him. Despite his personality, Shota has shown on several occasions that he is not completely devoid of joy or humor; he often grins whenever he is impressed by one of his students or after he tricks them with one of his 'rational deceptions'. His time before he was a teacher was seen in his recurring role in My Hero Academia: Vigilantes, where he dealt with street crime in Naruhata and often working alongside the Crawler, prior to leaving. Eraser Head gained a scar below one of his eyes fighting a Nomu that accompanied Tomura, Kurogiri, and their underlings in their attack on the Unforeseen Simulation Joint. During the Jaku Hospital Raid, Tomura throws one of Overhaul's Quirk-destroying bullets into Eraser Head's right leg, forcing him to amputate it on the spot to prevent himself from losing his Quirk.

  / 
 
 The school's English teacher whose Quirk  amplifies his voice using a jukebox-like collar. In the anime, Present Mic occasionally breaks the fourth wall by explaining a character's Quirk. The character's real name was based on a Japanese radio host named Hisashi Yamada, who hosts "Hisashi Yamada's Radi-Unlimited" on Tokyo FM. Hizashi was originally going to be a fat, bald old man who host the school orientation ceremony. However, Horikoshi thought that it was boring; instead he made him more excited at all. He often poses when he talks and maintains a certain level of excitement or volume, regardless of the situation. His attitude made Kyoka Jiro mistaken him for a simple announcer, rather than an actual Pro Hero. When in front of a crowd of people, he often attempts to bring his audience up to his level by getting them involved (he sometimes refers to them as his 'listeners', even while on a live stage). He continued to act this way regardless of the crowds' response as shown during the Sports Festival. He also volunteer to commentate rather than sitting through a boring event such as during the Remedial Hero License Training. Though he tends to be a jovial individual, Hizashi is capable of great rage as demonstrated by his reaction to discovering that Kurogiri is a Nomu created from the corpse of his late friend, Oboro Shirakumo and his confrontation with the man responsible, Kyudai Garaki. He expressed further grief and outrage over how the doctor's scientific gifts and knowledge could have helped humanity, but instead he chose to use them for evil. Much later, he angrily punched the man for what he did to his friend.

  / 
 
 Class 1-B's homeroom teacher. His Quirk  allows him to control his blood after it leaves his body. He can spread the blood out to form a variety of constructs. As a teacher, Vlad King has a caring attitude towards his students. He is willing to go out of his way to protect them and encourages them to do their absolute best. He also views Class 1-A as rivals but also values their growth and safety. He often uses them to motivate his own class to reach greater and greater goals. Although he cares for Class 1-A's well-being, Sekijiro has shown to have a bias commentary towards his class, as shown in the Joint Training Arc. He is one of the few people who knew about All Might's true form. He has been friends with Hound Dog for a long time. Despite being two years younger than Ryo Inui, Sekijiro attended the same class at U.A. High with him, being in the same class event, a drag café. This may imply that either Ryo was held back or Sekijiro has skipped the grades.

  / 
 
 The elderly school nurse whose Quirk  allows her to heal others' injuries by kissing them. Chiyo has worked at U.A. for over forty years and her words hold just as much authority as that of Principal Nezu's. Horikoshi describes her as the supporting mainstay of the school. Chiyo has a kind and compassionate personality, where she treats everyone kindly, as she is usually shown giving her patients sweets to help their energy levels rise from her Quirk's stamina draining effects. Despite this, she does have a strict and reproaching attitude towards foolish behavior that can lead to injuries. She is mostly like this with All Might for not teaching Izuku Midoriya how to use his Quirk properly or with Izuku for using his Quirk recklessly and injuring himself in the process. She eventually refuses to heal Izuku's injuries caused by One For All to prevent this habit from becoming an ongoing cycle, and encourages Izuku to find another way to master his Quirk's power without leading to self-injury. She can also be quite harsh and critical, as she rebuked Present Mic for being defeated by a swarm of bugs during his practical battle in the First Term Final Exam, despite his entomophobia.

  / 
 
 A dominatrix-themed Pro Heroine and a modern art history teacher at U.A. whose Quirk  allows her to produce a sleep-inducing fragrance from her body. Midnight was originally planned as the homeroom teacher of Class 1-A, but Horikoshi decides to give the role to Shota Aizawa because the author wanted to prefer someone willing to get sharp-tongued with the kids. She was a very playful and flirtatious person with an unpredictably serious and temperamental side to her. She got angry whenever someone interrupted her or when they insulted her, and when it came to insults, she was especially sensitive about her age. Midnight had no shame for dressing or acting sexually in front of young students and appeared to act on whims most of the time. When she accepted Mashirao Ojiro and Nirengeki Shoda's request to resign from the tournament, she commented that their naivety "turned her on". She was also very excited to see the chivalry displayed by Eijiro Kirishima during the tournament when he shook Tetsutetsu Tetsutetsu's hand. During the First Term Final Exams, Midnight admitted to Minoru Mineta that she has a sadistic side and enjoys dominating others. She can be impressed with those who resort to genius plans, as she was amazed by Minoru using tactical thinking to defeat her by luring her out and leaving her trapped in place before passing the gate. She was also a recurring character in the Vigilantes manga spin-off, having formed a strong friendship with Kazuho Haneyama/Pop☆Step. Midnight is killed during the Paranormal Liberation War in her attempt to defeat Gigantomachia.

  / 
 
 A Pro Hero and literature teacher at U.A. whose Quirk  allows him to control concrete. Cementoss is an often serious yet pleasant individual. He is very careful of the well being of others. He is the big fan of All Might despite being a Pro Hero himself. Like the rest of the professors at the U.A. High, he knows his secret identity and he tried his best to prevent others from discovering it, specifically when telling Eijiro Kirishima to avoid it. During the fight between Izuku and Shoto, Cementoss contacts Midnight and asks her if they should stop their fight because of Izuku's reckless fighting. During the Jaku Hospital Raid, Cementoss defeated Geten. He is immediately sent to the hospital after the Paranormal Liberation War.

  / 
 
 A Pro Hero specialized in search & rescue and teacher at U.A. whose Quirk  summons a black hole with her fingers that turns anything it sucks in into dust. She wears a full-body spacesuit that conceals her features. In a prototype concept, Thirteen was initially named No. 6 while her real name would have been . She is a wise, well-mannered woman. As a rescue hero, Thirteen has displayed how passionate she is about saving people through her teachings. She even developed her own training facility named the Unforeseen Simulation Joint, which is used to train future heroes in search and rescue tactics. She has also been shown to be very brave. Despite not being a combat type, she does not hesitate to use her Quirk to fight against villains for the sake of protecting others. During the Paranormal Liberation War, Thirteen lost her left arm due to Tomura's attack. Despite her injuries, Thirteen and other surviving heroes tried to prevent Tomura/All For One from escaping with a handful of allies and Nomus, but they are unsuccessful.

 
 
 A Pro Hero and math teacher at U.A. whose Quirk  allows him to spew out an ectoplasm-like dust from his helmet that can form into a clone of himself. Ectoplasm is a steadfast and unrelenting hero, which has made him highly popular. As a teacher, he desires the best from his students and is not afraid to push them; he openly warned Fumikage Tokoyami and Tsuyu Asui that he would do his best to crush them during their final exams. He also told them that he was looking for his students to shine under pressure. After the two passed the exam, Ectoplasm releases the students from the giant clone and commends them on their clever synergy.

 
 
 A gas mask-wearing Pro Hero and teacher at U.A. whose Quirk  allows him to alter the trajectory of his bullets. He is dressed in cowboy-like clothes. He is also in charge for the third year students. As the head of U.A.'s senior students in the Hero Course, Snipe shows to be quite intelligent and knowledgeable when it comes to battle practice, as he pointed out that having the first year students face robots during the Final Exams would not help them if they would continue to encounter villains in the future. While often calm, he is shown to be freaked out upon realising he accidentally bumped Toru Hagakure's chest with his elbow during his Final Exam battle, and frantically apologized to her.

  / 
 
 A Pro Hero and the support course teacher at U.A. whose Quirk  gives him metallic claws at the ends of his fingers, which allow him to dig and burrow underground. Horikoshi found out that drawing Higari's costume/armor was quite difficult. He describes the character as a prodigy who can create support items with self-assurance. Because of being a strict teacher who desires to see his students excel without constraint, Power Loader have developed a love-hate relationship with Mei Hatsume. Although he is easily angered by her carelessness, he still acknowledge her inventiveness and productivity.

 / 
 
 A Pro Hero and the lifestyle guidance counselor at U.A. whose Quirk  gives him the appearance of a dog. When he is angry, Hound Dog speaks in an incoherent and violent manner with a mix of words and a sound akin to a dog's growling. During the opening ceremony, he has some final comments to say. Unfortunately, his anger causes his speech to come out as a mix of words and incoherent growls, ending with a howl which scares a few of the students.

Faculty of Ketsubutsu Academy High School
  / 
 
 A Pro Hero and the teacher of Second Year, Class 2 at Ketsubetsu Academy High School. Her Quirk  forces her targets to burst into uncontrollable laughter that dulls their motor skills and impairs their cognitive abilities. Ms. Joke's general aesthetic was inspired by the DC Comics supervillain Joker. Her theme was clearer when she is around with Aizawa. Unlike the original Batman and Joker whom have clashing personalities and worldviews, she and Shota Aizawa get along well and understand one another. Ms. Joke is known for her cheerful and outgoing personality. She always has a goofy and somewhat obnoxious sense of humor on full display and jumps at the chance to make others laugh. She takes no shame in flirting with the Class 1-A's homeroom teacher Shota Aizawa, endlessly trying to break his cold exterior to get out a smile. Though her behavior appeared to be unprofessional, Ms. Joke takes her job as a teacher and Pro Hero very seriously, and clearly has a thorough understanding of heroics, as demonstrated through her commentary with Shota throughout the license exam. After the exam concludes with a substantial portion of both Ms. Joke's and Shota's classes passing, she suggests that they carry out joint training with both classes in the future and Shota agrees.

The Wild Wild Pussycats
The  are a group of four cat-themed Heroes. The hero group specialize in mountain rescue operations and are veterans in their respective field, and they even own their large forested mountain. They have twelve years of rescuing experience and expertise. They were enlisted by U.A. during the Forest Training Arc to help train the students. Among its members are:

  / 
 
The leader of the Pussycats whose Quirk  allows her to advise and instruct multiple people at once through mental transmission. She also has an ability in sending messages to other people at a time. Although she can send messages, her drawbacks is that she cannot receive to them. Her personality contrasts with her partner, Pixie-Bob's. While Pixie-Bob is often loud and energetic, Mandalay remains calm and gentle. Even so, she remains just as eccentric and demanding as the rest of her teammates. She often shows great concern for others including her nephew Kota, as well as the students from U.A. High. Despite being genuinely caring, Mandalay is not above poking fun at other's expense. She had no problem teasing Class 1-A about how much longer it would take them to cross Beast's Forest than the Pussycats. She extended this to her nephew by pointing out his similar shoes to Izuku.

  / 
 
A member of the Pussycats whose Quirk  allows her to freely manipulate the ground. Described as hyperactive and loud person, Pixie-Bob is very self-conscious about her age and punished Izuku Midoriya when he nearly brought it up, saying that she's still eighteen at heart. Mandalay stated that Pixie-Bob is in a rush to find love and that her impatience has only grown worse over the years. Pixie-Bob seems to have a fondness for young promising heroes like Izuku, Tenya Ida, Shoto Todoroki, and Katsuki Bakugo and is unafraid to display it. During the Vanguard Action Squad Invasion, she was attacked by Magne and Spinner, and knocked unconsciously by Magne's iron rod. Following the incident, Pixie-Bob is taken to the hospital to have her wound treated. Sometime afterward, her injury has been healed.

  / 
 
 A member of the Pussycats whose former Quirk  allows her to observe and monitor up to 100 people at a time. Even among the overzealous and eccentric Pussycats team, Ragdoll stands out as the most hyperactive personality among them. She is very energetic and can be told through her body language, like constant blinking or the inability to remain still. She was kidnapped by the League of Villains during the Vanguard Action Squad Invasion, but she was later rescued by Tiger when the Pro Heroes began to infiltrate the villains' hideout. After her Quirk is stolen by All For One offscreen so that he can find Tomura, Ragdoll remains a part of the team and is now taking care of the office duties. All For One has offered to return the Quirk to Ragdoll while incarcerated.

  / 
 
 The only male member of the Pussycats. His Quirk  allows him to stretch and bend his body. Tiger is a transgender man. Born female, he transitioned in Thailand a long time ago, bringing his external appearance and social presentation in line with his male identity. He is a very macho, strict, and intimidating man who seem always has a fear-inducing aura surrounding him. At the same time, he maintains the same level of goofy eccentricity as his teammates. He is unafraid to push his students, even inviting them to break their muscles so they can grow back stronger. He does not tolerate any slacking off, and is willing to physically punish students who are not "Plus Ultra". Tiger also has a caring side, being very adamant about protecting both his students and teammates. He became enraged at the sight of Pixie-Bob's assault at the hands of Magne.

The Lurkers
The  are a group of Heroes. Although the team consists of only three heroes in its ranks, it can be considered as quite powerful since they are very highly-ranked heroes in the Japanese Hero Billboard Chart. This implies that the team is strong and versatile. Among its members are:

  / 
 
 A Pro Hero and the leader of The Lurkers whose Quirk  enables him to manipulate the thinness of his body. He can use his Quirk to move around quickly, slip through tight spaces, and pierce targets by folding himself into sharp shapes. Befitting the nature of a shinobi, Edgeshot is a calm and focused individual person. He was able to maintain a level-head even in crisis situations and consoles his teammates when they begin to panic. He is quite intelligent and is good at analyzing situations and strategies. He was able to discern the nature of All For One's warping Quirk after only seeing it in action once. Edgeshot is quick to take initiative in able to prevent the conflict situations, and is brave enough to take action in the worst of circumstances. In order to assist All Might, Edgeshot along with Endeavor, even took on the likes of All For One. He was also a recurring character in the My Hero Academia: Vigilantes manga spin-off, where he got invited by Makoto Tsukauchi for a participation in the farewell show dedicated to Captain Celebrity at the Tokyo Sky Egg on the occasion of his return to the United States.

  / 
 
 A Pro Hero and member of The Lurkers who whose Quirk  gives him the ability to manipulate his tree-like limbs. Although currently known for a little bit about him, Kamui Woods had a very dark childhood and it is said that his childhood was made into a popular documentary. Shinji is a very serious and focused person when it comes to being a hero in his hero duties; however, he easily feels down when someone takes his glory or credit. At the same time, he also appears to be rather emotional when he was invited by Edgeshot to be part of The Lurkers, he cried in happiness for two hours.

  / 
 
 A Pro Hero and only female member of The Lurkers whose Quirk  allows her to grow to a gigantic height. Mt. Lady was originally conceived by Kōhei Horikoshi to be the female lead, but was replaced by Ochaco due to not knowing how to utilize her Quirk in the story. Her original design was created from Ochaco's prototype concept, and also would end up given to Class 1-B's student Yui Kodai. In the 10th manga volume, she started her own Hero Agency at a young age, and despite her high number of successes, she causes unintentional destruction to the city thanks to her Quirk. While she works hard to earn money for the reparations, she ends up causing destruction again and this cycle ends up repeating itself. Her hard work is also what brought her into the Hideout Raid Team. During Minoru Mineta's internship, she appears to be very lazy because she forced him to work instead of teaching him. Furthermore, she also has a lecherous side, as seen when she takes interest in Shoto Todoroki. Compared to other Pro Heroes, she is much more flamboyant and less mature, relishing the media attention that comes with her heroic deeds, but is willing to take her work seriously when needed.

Foreign Heroes
  / 
 The top hero from the United States. She was saved by All Might during her childhood and became a Hero inspired by him. Her Quirk  allows her to alter the nature of objects and beings in contact with her according to her will. Her hero name was based on a nickname for the flag of the United States ("Stars and Stripes"), after which her costume was designed. Horikoshi describes the pro hero as "cool, cute, and strong". She was killed during an attempt to defeat Tomura. However, before she died, she changes New Order's ability into one that destroys other Quirks, leading to the destruction of several Quirks stolen by All For One while also severely injuring Tomura.

 
 
 A pro hero from Otheon introduced in My Hero Academia: World Heroes' Mission. Her Quirk  allows her to see through anything and to the other side. Clair holds a calm, resolved and relatively serious composure. She is a dutiful hero who assists others when needed, such as the raid on Humarise Headquarters.

 
 
 The top hero from Egypt, introduced in My Hero Academia: World Heroes' Mission. His Quirk  allows him to turn his body paper-thin. He was described as the one who spends his time protecting Egypt and "has a strange aura that makes the citizens feel at ease" when he fights. It is said that no one has ever seen his back to this day, and his Quirk makes him flexible which is similar to Edgeshot. He is later introduced into the manga where he and Big Red Dot expressed frustration at being kept from assisting Japan against All For One.

 
 The top hero from Singapore, introduced in My Hero Academia: World Heroes' Mission. His Quirk  allows him to fire powerful blasts of water from his mouth. His appearance and Quirk was based on the Merlion folk creature. He is later introduced into the manga where he and Salaam expressed frustration at being kept from assisting Japan against All For One.

  / 
 A pro hero from the United States with the Quirk  who appears in My Hero Academia: Vigilantes as a recurring character who is forced to relocate to Japan due to his arrogant playboy ways causing him problems with his marriage and numerous lawsuits filed against him. Despite his initial arrogance he becomes good friends with the Vigilante the Crawler and manages to improve himself over time to eventually allow himself to be able to return home and in the finale gets the Crawler out of legal trouble by claiming him as his sidekick, effectively recruiting him into his company.

Other Heroes
 
 
 A very tall man who wields an unknown Quirk that gives his arms super-strength. He once criticized Izuku for his attempts to rescue Bakugo and was responsible for exposing Slidin' Go's connection with the Paranormal Liberation Front. Due to the many criticisms towards him during the Dark Hero Arc, Death Arms retired from the Pro Hero business.

  / 
 
 A Pro Hero whose Quirk  gives him the abilities and appearance of a killer whale which he can use in the water or land. He appears to be a calm and focused hero who treats every situation seriously. He is friendly and a good comrade towards his fellow Pro Heroes. He was relieved that Tiger was able to rescue his ally and calmed him when he was worried about her condition. He also teased Best Jeanist on being unable to change Katsuki Bakugo's personality and reform his crude attitude. He was the one to be antagonistic during the second phase of the Provisional Hero License Exam. He is not above calling out the students on their mistakes. Despite his hard exterior, Gang Orca admits that he enjoys seeing the students trying to make up for their mistakes. He was very rude and belittling to the students who failed the licensing exam. Despite his harsh words and the menacing front he puts on, he does really care about the students put under his teaching and desires to help motivate them so they can become heroes with heart.

  / 
 
 A Pro Hero and former sidekick to All Might whose Quirk  allows him to see a person's future. He was designed after the stereotypical look of a Japanese salaryman, contrasting All Might's American looks. At first, Nighteye proves that he disapproved of All Might choosing Izuku Midoriya who is previously Quirkless, to be his successor and inherit One For All. He protested against this strongly, saying that there would be any number of people more suitable and declared that Izuku could not become his successor on good intentions and willpower alone, showing a far more pragmatic approach. However, he hired Izuku into his agency after learning that he did not damage any of Sir Nighteye's merchandise of All Might. He was shown to be cared on All Might and expressed grave concern when he would continue with his hero duties after receiving horrific injuries from his first battle with All For One. He pleaded with All Might to retire and focus on finding a successor, foreseeing that he would meet a horrible death should he continue serving as the Symbol of Peace. Nighteye is fatally wounded by Overhaul during the Shie Hassaikai raid, and later dies in the hospital in All Might's company.

  / 
 
 A Pro Hero who employed Tamaki Amajiki and Eijiro Kirishima for their internships. His Quirk  allows him to use his fat to absorb the impact from collisions. The more impacts his fat absorbs, the thinner he gets. Fat Gum appears to be constantly hungry, which leads him to eat a lot. He is friendly towards civilians and other heroes, appearing to be a playful and carefree person. However, he gets extremely serious when the situation demands it, always having the work ethic of a hero. He was also a recurring character in the Vigilantes manga spin-off, where he witnessed All Might defeating the villains and seen him in the hero office. Fat Gum is a kind man and will prioritize helping people and saving lives first. He cares deeply about the well being of others, especially those in his care, which is why he becomes so angry when villains threaten the lives of others. He was very worried about Eijiro's state after the fight with Eight Precepts of Death and cried tears of relief when he realized Eijiro was fine.

  / 
 
 A Pro Hero whose Quirk  enables him to lock any non-living item in a position. Ken is a very pragmatic and blunt man who is quick to judge whether or not someone is an asset. His confidence sometimes borders on arrogance, as he tells Sir Nighteye to use his foresight on him to prove it is fallible, believing himself entirely capable of escaping whatever fate Sir Nighteye sees. He is often annoyed by inexperience, though this may be due to the stakes of their mission against Overhaul. However, his critical attitude does not border to malice as he glad that Tamaki Amajiki did not get injured. Though he makes snap judgements of others and strongly doubts the capabilities of the students, his first impressions are not set in stone, as he is very impressed and proud when the students exceed his expectations and goes so far as to say they are better heroes than the adult ones.

  / 
 
 A Pro Hero whose unnamed Quirk allows him to control water. Despite Manual being a side character, Horikoshi stated that he likes drawing him. Manual has a very kind, attentive and ordinary personality. He has an inspiring attitude, as he wants to become a role model for all modern heroes and can complete any tasks simply. In the extras, it was revealed that he chose Tenya Ida because he feels similar to Tenya. He tells Tenya that he is very excited to be mentoring Ingenium's younger brother, and is confused as to why Tenya would not have chosen a more famous hero to intern with. He also has a very keen mind and could figure out the reason that Tenya chose his office was to find Hero Killer: Stain.

  / 
 
 A retired hero, and a former mentor of All Might and Izuku Midoriya whose Quirk  allows him to shoot air from the soles of his feet. Elements of Sorahiko's character are based on Yoda. Initially, Gran Torino appeared to be a senile old man who forgot and asked Izuku Midoriya's name, often calling him "Toshinori". Even though he was the one who sent Izuku the internship offer, he would often fail to recall Izuku's name for more than a moment. In reality, this proves to be nothing more than a façade for messing with his newfound protégé. As a mentor, Gran Torino appears to be very hard on his students. Every time All Might speaks about or to Gran Torino, he starts freaking out and shakes profusely because of his memories of their brutal training. Nevertheless, he does not hesitate to praise his students when they deserve it such as when he complimented Izuku for his gradual skill with his power and when he complimented All Might's victory over All For One. Since the Hideout Raid Arc, he continued assisting the Police Force in investigating the League of Villains, and later the Paranormal Liberation Front. After the Paranormal Liberation War, he remains inactive in hero work due to his injuries.

  / 
 
 Tenya's older brother and a former Pro Hero whose Quirk  allows him to release propulsion jets from his elbows and shoot himself forward at turbo speed. Compared to his younger brother, Tensei is far more laid back with an easy-going attitude. When he took up the hero mantle of his family, his image for himself was that he wanted to 'be cool' and be the type of hero that helps others when they are in need of help. He was joyful that his younger brother admired his work as a pro hero as a result. Unfortunately, he resigned after being badly injured by Stain and asks Tenya to take up his hero name. Tensei has also shown to be proud on Tenya's heroic intentions. He congratulated his brother for obtaining the Provisional Hero License and considering that he was already prepared, he told him the familiar method of how to improve his Quirk and make Recipro more powerful, faster, and last longer than before, by pulling out his mufflers and training.

  / 
 
 A centipede-headed Nighteye Agency member. His Quirk  grants him long centipede-like limbs with agonizing poison. He is a gentleman and a very well-mannered person. Following Sir Nighteye's death, Centipeder takes over the Nighteye Agency.

  / 
 
 One of Sir Nighteye's assistants whose Quirk  allows her to make bubbles filled with an aroma that she has smelled at least once before. Bubble Girl is shown to be a fairly serious and dedicated hero. She appears to be calm, even she feels worried about Sir Nighteye who would fired her, which happens quite frequently. She remained at the Nighteye Agency following Sir Nighteye's death.

  / 
 
 A Pro Hero and a bodyguard of the Police Force. His unnamed Quirk enables him to turn his body into sand and control it. As a hero, Snatch seemed to care much about the feelings of crime victims, such as families of murdered people. Even while facing villains, he did not hesitate to put his battle aside and rescue the officers transporting Kai Chisaki from crashing their van. Snatch guarded the convoy guarding a defeated Overhaul and was killed by a combination attack from Dabi and Mr. Compress that turned him to glass.

  / 
 
 A Pro Hero and one of over thirty sidekicks who work at the Endeavor Agency. Her Quirk  allows her to weaponize her fire-like hair. As her hero name suggests, Moe possesses a burning hot personality. Her personality tends to clash with that of Katsuki Bakugo. In the 25th volume of the manga, she was shown to feel love about festivals.

Villains

League of Villains
The  is an organization originally established and led by All For One that intends to destroy hero society and return villains to prominence, as they were before the rise of All Might.

After the League wins their war with the Meta Liberation Army, Tomura merges both organizations to form the Paranormal Liberation Front.

  / 
 
 The main antagonist of the series and All For One's apprentice. Born the grandson of All Might's master Nana Shimura, he was rescued off the streets by All For One as a child after he accidentally slaughtered his entire family with his Quirk  which enables him to disintegrate whatever he touches with his fingers and anything connected to it. The character was based on the protagonist of the author's first one-shot titled "Tenko", starring the eponymous boy during war time in feudal Japan. While Horikoshi drawing his character, he found out that drawing inexpressive hands was extremely difficult. He stated that he was on the verge of tears every week due to having to draw a particular character which they are left to assume is Tomura. Tomura made the group known to the heroes by leading the attack on the Unforeseen Simulation Joint. He has a malevolent and warped personality, considered to be the dark reflection of Izuku Midoriya. He does not care for his or almost anyone else's life, having no qualms about performing evil deeds like murdering innocent people. Much like a child, he seemed unable to cope with his own feelings, instead lashing out and abusing both others or himself, tearing at his own neck when he becomes frustrated. This particular meltdown stems from the abuse he suffered from his hero-hating father and being alone during his childhood, with All For One claiming that it represented his suppressed urge to kill and destroy. During his fight with Re-Destro, he overcame the past shackles of guilt through his childhood feelings after remembering his memories alone and now looks forward to end the hero society. After All For One is arrested, Tomura takes full control of the League and eventually trains his Quirk to the point that he becomes the second most dangerous villain in Japan next to All For One himself. But Tomura is revealed to have inherited All For One's Quirk as part of the villian's scheme to acquire One For All, with All For One's visage gradually absorbing Tomura's consciousness.

  / 
 
His Quirk  enables him to both steal and bestow Quirks, as well as wield multiple Quirks at once. He is also obsessed with stealing One For All because it is the only Quirk that can oppose him and has successfully defied him throughout history. The character was inspired by the Star Wars antagonist Darth Vader. All For One is a subtle, sadistic and malevolent man, who likes to rule from the shadows and enjoys himself at the expense of people. In the past, he cared for his younger brother Yoichi, although he was condescending towards him. He mocked his frail brother, saying that without power, it is impossible to assert one's ideals. He has a firm contempt for ideals of justice and morality, dismissing them as beliefs of other people that shackle personal freedom. All For One is a patient mentor towards his protégé, Tomura. He has a constructive criticism and encouragement to his successor whenever Tomura fails. He also prefers to teach Tomura by providing him opportunities and different experiences that he can learn from. However, this benevolence is a façade because All For One views Tomura as a valuable tool to steal One For All. Although he is initially defeated by All Might and imprisoned in Tartarus for his crimes, revealed to have placed his Quirk into Tomura years prior, All For One eventually escapes when Tomura and Garaki's surviving Nomus launch an assault on the prison and free all of its inmates. Acquiring a drug that Kyudai reverse engineered from Overhaul's Quirk-Destroying Drug to function like Eri's Quirk and warned that it would eventually revert him into nothingness, All For One uses it on himself during the final battle to fight at his prime while adamant that his visage within Tomura would see his goals through to the end.

  /  / 
 
 Tomura's caretaker and the League's second-in-command. His Quirk  allows him to generate a dark purple fog from his body and use it to create weaponized long-ranged portals. Kurogiri has a level-headed personality, which often serves to ground Tomura's immaturity and temper. He is intensely loyal to both All For One and Tomura, having been created to watch over the latter. As a Nomu, he is programmed to only obey commands from selecting a few and remain silent towards any attempt to extract compromising information about the League from him. Kurogiri is very polite and well-spoken even to his enemies, sometimes introducing himself in a formal manner. However, just like his fellow villains of the League, he possesses a truly sinister nature, having no qualms in putting hero students in situations where they would be tortured or killed. Kurogiri assisted Tomura in leading an assortment number of underlings in the attack on the Unforeseen Simulation Joint. After he is captured by Gran Torino and imprisoned in Tartarus, he is revealed to be a Nomu created from the corpse of Oboro Shirakumo, Eraserhead and Present Mic's high school classmate and close friend with an unnamed Cloud Quirk who died years ago in a villain attack. At the time when Kurogiri was among the Nomu held at Cental Hospital, Neito Monoma was able to use his Copy Quirk in order to copy Warp Gate in order to surprise the villains and split them up in the different parts of Japan. Spinner, some Paranormal Liberation Front members, and the Paranormal Liberation Front supporters raided the hospital. Despite resistance from Present Mic, Spinner was successful in awakening Kurogiri through a special device that All For One placed on him.

  / 
 
 All For One's personal doctor and a genius mad scientist. His Quirk  grants him an extended lifespan and makes him look younger than he actually is. Because of his Quirk, Kyudai is one of the oldest characters in the series, having been alive since the uprising of Quirks although it's unclear whether he is older than All For One. He is also responsible for creating the Nomu. Kyudai is an eccentric and deranged scientist, who dutifully follows All For One's will. Similar to Gigantomachia, he did not believe that Tomura was yet worthy of succeeding All For One. Due to a compromise he made with his former master, he was willing to give Tomura the chance to prove him wrong. While under the alias of Dr. Tsubasa at one of his clinics, he pointed out to Izuku's mother Inko Midoriya that Izuku should give up to be a hero due to being diagnosed as Quirkless. During the Jaku Hospital Raid, Kyudai was apprehended. Police Force member Gori was outside his cell when Kyudai mentioned about the day when All For One first met Dabi. The character's name was previously , but was changed following the backlash in relation to the war crimes committed by Unit 731 during the Second World War.

  / 
 
 A four-eyed villain who works as a broker for the League of Villains. His Quirk  allows him to cause minor amnesia to a person by making physical contact with their head. Giran appears to be indifferent and unsympathetic towards others, focused only on getting money from his clients. Despite being only interested in profiting of his dealings, Giran does possess standards. He refuses to have dealings with anyone he hates, and no amount of money or threats will change his mind. He also has an affable and even kind side towards some his clients, most notably Jin Bubaigawara, who had been left alone and mentally scarred after an incident involving his Quirk. Seeing that Jin was at such a low point, he encouraged him to join a group who could use his talents, saying that outcasts like him are more common than he thinks.

  / 
 
 A disdainful and sociopathic villain whose Quirk  allows him to generate and control a stronger variant of Endeavor's Hellflame, possessing a high cold resistance but unable to withstand his own flames for a prolonged amount of time which explains the burns and staples on parts of his body. Dabi was a stoic, aloof, confident, and focused individual who rarely shows emotion. While rather crude and violent, he is cautious, choosing to retreat when Mirko arrived to aid Endeavor and made sure not to divulge too much information to Hawks about High-End because of the infancy of their relationship. Despite his usual expressionless behavior, Dabi finds joy in establishing himself as a villain fighting what he believes to be false heroes, an ideology proposed by his apparent inspiration, Stain. He is dedicated to Stain's mission and desires to destroy superhuman society, sharing his belief that one person with the necessary conviction can do so. He is later revealed to be Toya Todoroki, Endeavor's eldest son who was thought to have died years ago in a training accident and was driven to villainy after his father ultimately deems him useless for lacking the right Quirk to surpass All Might. Initially energetic and boisterous as a child with a desire to learn to learn his father, Toya went through an existential crisis with replaced with Shoto which led to him despising both his younger brother and their father. While Dabi intended to kill his younger brother Shoto as revenge, he takes advantage of Endeavor becoming Japan's new Number One Hero to expose their family life to the nation. During Class 1-A's battle with the Paranormal Liberation Front, Shoto faces his brother due to their initial similarities in hating Endeavor. During the Final War Arc, Dabi faces off against Shoto. After a fierce battle, Dabi is defeated by Shoto. At some point during the fight, Dabi managed to copy Shoto's Phosphor move to keep from being fully frozen as he burns Kido and Onima. Skeptic speaks through a device on a neaerby High-End Nomu informing him that Endeavor is fighting All For One.

 
 
 A demented yandere-type girl able to assume the physical appearance of another with her Quirk  which involves her drinking a person's blood in order turn into that person, this ability later evolved to allow her to use the Quirk of whoever she turns into, provided that she has access to information about that quirk. Horikoshi stated that Toga is the hardest female character to illustrate so far, her eyes and hair being particularly difficult. She is a cheerful girl, to the point of smiling even after having presumably killing someone, displaying sadistic tendencies. However, she has shown to be easily embarrassed, such as when she thinks people are coming on to her, or when she is naked when copying clothes of the people that she has transformed into. She's considered to be an arch-enemy of Ochaco Uraraka, although she also fought Tsuyu Asui; causing Tsuyu to feel hatred towards Toga. Despite her attempt to kill both girls, she tries to befriend them as they fight, affectionately calling Tsuyu by her first name and describing the former as "lovely". When talking to Ochaco, she said that it is only natural to want to be like the one you love, and for Toga this means physically becoming whoever it is that she has romantic feelings towards. This warped idea of how romance works, is due to her psychotic nature and obsession with blood. Her obsession with blood plays into her warped perception of how romance relationships work because she needs to drink a persons blood to become them. During the Provisional Hero License Exam, she disguised herself as Camie while fighting Izuku. She also transforms into Ochaco and tries to tag Izuku, but he saw through her disguise. He saves her despite knowing she was not the real Ochaco. Toga then transforms back into Camie once she finds that Izuku saw through her disguise. She leaves the area afterwards which later makes Hanta, Denki and Minoru feel suspicious about Izuku having a naked encounter with "Camie". Toga was driven to villainy when her parents spurned her for her morbid blood obsession, eventually running away from home after attacking a bleeding student she liked in a moment of weakness. Her insanity/villainy was also caused by the fact that she was forced to repress her true behavior. Her inability to express her obsession with blood without being shunned by society, thus led to her psychotic mental state. She became romantically obsessed with Izuku after the first meeting in an injured state. This attraction towards Izuku was caused by her obsession with blood. She is also attracted to Ochaco. Her desire to be accepted by society and her association of her blood obsession with love; fuels her wild obsession for both Izuku and Ochaco.

  / 
 
 A masked villain initially suffered an existential crisis along with having an apparent form of dissociative personality disorder due to an incident involving his Quirk . This Quirk allows him to create copies of anything he touches, including himself once overcoming his personal issues. Twice enjoyed assuming dramatic poses and eccentric facial expressions. He constantly contradicted himself, making a statement in one voice and then immediately saying the opposite in another voice. For example, he insulted Dabi and then praised him in the same sentence. During his confrontation with Skeptic's clones, Jin was revealed to create clones to compensate for his loneliness before being traumatized when his clones got tired of being bossed around and then ended up killing each other after he was knocked out. He joined the League of Villains because they accepted his craziness and made him feel comfortable in his own skin. His desperation to find friends lead him to trust others very quickly. As a side effect, this also left him vulnerable to betrayal and emotionally devastated when people like Overhaul or Hawks turned on him. When injured by the fake clones Skeptic created, he moved past his trauma after realizing that he was the original and did not hesitate to protect Himiko Toga. Though his clones still displayed conflict over the original, they are able to work past it for their goals. It is shown that even after conquering his inner demons that Jin still occasionally experienced relapses, suggesting his multiple split personality issues. He is fatally wounded by Hawks during the Jaku Hospital Raid, dying in Toga's arms after saving her from being captured by the heroes.

  / 
 
 A flashy villain and former stage magician whose Quirk  allows him to instantly shrink down anything in a spherical area into a small marble without actually damaging it. Before he is recruited by the League of Villains, Atsuhiro works as an entertainer and is the great-great-grandson of Oji Harima, a criminal from the distant past who stole from false heroes, preaching reformation while giving back to the people on the streets. As a member of the peerless thief's lineage, Atsuhiro was instilled with the values of fighting corruption and exposing injustices. During the League's meeting with the Shie Hassaikai, Atsuhiro loses his left arm when he attempts to take down Overhaul and has it replaced with a prosthetic. During the Jaku Hospital Raid, he sustains grievous injuries while saving the other members of the League from being captured by heroes and is left behind on the battlefield by All For One.

  / 
 
 A reptilian villain whose Quirk  gives him the appearance and abilities of a gecko. He was inspired to join the League by Stain and admires the Hero Killer so much that he modeled his look and fighting style off of his, wanting to change society due to the prejudice he suffered for his appearance. Spinner has little respect for heroes, purposely treading on Pixie-Bob's face, grinning as she lies on the ground beneath his foot, unconscious and bleeding as a result of his and Magne's earlier attack due to the fact that he believes heroes are corrupt. Despite being a villain, he seem to have a sense of morality and is shocked upon learning of Tomura's true goal of eradicating society altogether, rather than reshaping it to make it better. His dedication to Stain's ideology also has him question some of the League's actions, such as attacking a police convoy in order to exact revenge on Overhaul. During the Paranormal Liberation War, he tells Himiko Toga to come back to them safely when she leaves to confront Ochaco Uraraka, and also aided Tomura when he was unconscious, and gave him a signature hand mask to wake him up which helps him to achieve his dream. While facing Tentacole, Spinner is revealed to have been enhanced with two additional Quirks: a Body Bulk Quirk to increase his muscles and size along with the Quirk Scalemail to augment his strength and defense.

  / 
 
 A transgender woman whose Quirk  allows her to magnetize others within an area around herself. Magne had a cruel and brutal personality, befitting a murderous criminal. According to Tiger, she has committed nine armed robberies, three murders, and twenty-nine attempted murders. During her role in the League, Magne was shown to be quite perceptive and suited for quick thinking, as shown when she deduced Izuku Midoriya had been the one to defeat Muscular and he needed to be put down and was the one that created the idea to go after the students, after they rescued Katsuki Bakugo. It was revealed that she had an unnamed friend who still supported her decision to live life the way she chose, despite not possessing the courage to do the same thing herself. She is brutally killed by Overhaul after recklessly attacking the latter with her Quirk.

  / 
 
 A malefic villain whose Quirk  allows him to enlarge the muscle fibers beneath his skin, granting him immense strength, speed, stamina, and durability. Befitting his appearance, Muscular has a very sadistic and bloodthirsty personality. He openly admits that he wants to use his Quirk freely to kill. Muscular was responsible for killing the Water Hose duo. During the Forest Training Arc, Muscular took part in the mission to capture Bakugo for the League of Villains and was imprisoned in Tartarus after being defeated by Izuku. Although he later escapes from Tartarus during a prison break led by All For One, he is ultimately defeated again by Izuku and re-imprisoned for his crimes.

 
 
 A teenage villain whose Quirk  allows him to generate vast amounts of a toxic sleeping gas from his body. As he is not immune to his own Quirk, Mustard wears a gas mask that is attached to two oxygen tanks on his back. He has been shown to be pragmatic. Mustard believes that no matter how impressive a person's Quirk is, it does not change the fact that they are still only human. During the Forest Training Arc, Mustard took part in the mission to capture Bakugo for the League of Villains and was defeated by Tetsutetsu in one punch.

 
 
 An insane and cannibalistic villain whose Quirk  allows him to lengthen, sharpen, and manipulate his teeth into webs of powerful blades. During the Jump Festa '21 event, Horikoshi confirmed that the character was inspired by the Cenobites from the Hellraiser franchise. Moonfish is an insane, laconic individual who talks to himself and is fascinated with consuming flesh. He has a habit of repeating key information to himself in able to stay focused on his objectives. During the Forest Training Arc, Moonfish took part in the mission to capture Bakugo for the League of Villains and was imprisoned in Tartarus after being defeated by Tokoyami's Quirk. He later escapes from Tartarus during the prison break led by All For One.

 
 
 An immensely powerful kaiju-sized villain who has multiple Quirks and is deeply loyal to All For One. According to Garaki, the Nomu were based on him. Gigantomachia appears to be a polite person at first, but he became impatient and aggressive to those who are uncooperative with him. If someone manages to help him out though, he will leave and avoid a confrontation. He is also a faithful servant to All For One and questions Tomura's worthiness as his successor. His devotion and obedience to All For One are great that simply hearing a recording of All For One's voice can calm him from breaking out into a blind rage. Eventually, Gigantomachia began to acknowledge Tomura as All For One's successor after the fight of Re-Destro even shedding a tear of joy at him standing proud over his defeated foe. During the Jaku Hospital Raid, he is sedated by Kirishima, defeated by Endeavor, and left behind on the battlefield by All For One.

Nomu

They are also called Artificial Humans and lack brain function making them obedient to whoever uses them. The Nomu have been used by the League of Villains even when they merge with the Meta-Liberation Army to form the Paranormal Liberation Front.

Each of the Nomu are separated into different tiers:

 The Lower Tier Nomu serve as the foot soldiers and are the weakest of the Nomu. Some of the useful members of this tier are by Doctor Garaki's side.
 The Middle Tier Nomu are more colors to them.
 The Upper Tier Nomu can match blows with the Heroes. They are described to be as strong as 10 people.
 The Near High-End Nomu are incomplete Nomu that lack any intelligence.
 The High-End Nomu are the strongest of the Nomu and possess six Quirks.

The prequel manga My Hero Academia: Vigilantes reveals that the current version of the Nomu were created in response to how they can defeat even the mightiest hero through sheer force of will.

Besides Kurogiri, the following are the known Nomu:

 
 
 A highly advanced and sentient High-End Nomu made from an unnamed street punk who attacks Endeavor and Hawks in Kyushu. Hood openly showed some signs of obedience and loyalty to his master. He spoke with a stutter and broken grammar. He is revealed to possess six different Quirks and is able to severely injure Endeavor before the latter incinerates him with his ultimate super move Prominence Burn.

 
 A small Nomu with a cable-like bottom that is owned by Daruma and has the ability to teleport people by spraying a goo that makes its recipient a medium for the teleportation. Johnny wears a helmet that enables Daruma to control where anyone is teleported to. During the Jaku Hospital Raid, he was killed by the falling door as Mirko breaks through the laboratory.

Meta Liberation Army
The  is a powerful organization of villains originally founded and led by the infamous villain . They also serve as the titular main antagonists of the Meta Liberation Army Arc.

They are considered as one of the most infamous villain groups and their leader is compared to the likes of All For One. During the time of his imprisonment, Destro wrote the Meta Liberation War, an autobiographical book in which he exposes his ideology of Quirks liberation, and resulted in several reprints due to its popularity.

After the Meta Liberation Army is defeated by the League of Villains, Tomura merges the two organizations to create the Paranormal Liberation Front where it contains a number of unnamed members.

  / 
 
 The condescending grand commander of the Meta Liberation Army and a descendant of Destro. His Quirk  grants him the ability to convert his stress and anger into raw power, which turns him into a hulking monster and significantly enhances his strength. At first, Re-Destro seems to be a completely normal and balanced person. However, this public persona is merely a façade, for he is a devout follower of his ancestor's ideals and believes that Quirks should be celebrated rather than suppressed and controlled. Re-Destro does not hesitate to kill and torture people in able to achieve his goals, and he does not tolerate the insult or lack of respect for either Destro or the Meta Liberation Army. When his secretary Miyashita defined Destro's book as pretentious and the Liberation Army as terrorists, he snaps his neck and kills him on the spot. However, he seemed to show some remorse by shedding genuine sad tears about the act. He attempts to wipe out the League of Villains, but ultimately fails when Tomura defeats him in battle and damages his lower legs, prompting him to submit to Tomura. He joined the Paranormal Liberation Front as one of its lieutenants and now uses a high-tech wheelchair due to his damaged parts getting amputated. During the Jaku Hospital Raid, Re-Destro is defeated by Edgeshot and imprisoned for his crimes.

  / 
 
 A manipulative and levelheaded politician who serves as one of the executives of the Meta Liberation Army. His Quirk  allows him to boost the physical and mental abilities of his subordinates from his voice. Koku portrays himself as a calm and level-headed man, as he was not fazed by Curious' death, and instead displayed his intelligence and skills in manipulation by instead taking advantage of her death and along with using his Quirk to further motivate and strengthen his comrades instead, showing his skills as a worthy leader and military commander. He is also shown to be arrogant as seen when Spinner compared himself to the Meta Liberation Army and stated how they were the same, earning his malice by insinuating that Spinner was his equal. He is later captured by the heroes during the Jaku Hospital Raid and imprisoned for his crimes.

  / 
 
 A tech-savvy executive member of the Meta Liberation Army whose Quirk  allows him to take a human-sized object and turn it into an exact lookalike of any given person, which he can then control like a puppet. In battle, Skeptic is a ruthless and calculating opponent. He calmly ordered his puppets to break Twice's arms to stop him from resisting further and reacted to Himiko's reawakening with only the minor irritation that he would have to adjust his puppets' strength in order to kill her. As he initially failed to capture Twice and kill Toga, he immediately became obsessed with not failing and denying that he did, assuring himself and his superior that everything was within his prediction, and later acted recklessly by entering into the front lines of combat himself in order not to fail, despite knowing that he was completely abandoning the strategic advantage afforded to him by his Quirk to be able to combat someone in a safe location. He is very loyal to Re-Destro, even after the Army merged with the League of Villains and became the Paranormal Liberation Front, he still cared for and abided by his former master's wishes. He is the only executive member of the Meta Liberation Army who is not captured by the heroes during the Jaku Hospital Raid.

  / 
 
 A blue-skinned executive member of the Meta Liberation Army who gets her villain name from her very inquisitive personality. Her Quirk  allows her to turn anything she touches into a bomb. As described by her Liberation Army code name, Chitose was an immensely curious woman who is highly invested in her journalistic pursuits. She had been inspired to claim the hearts of the people with her stories, all for the sake of their villain group. She is killed by Toga during the war between the League of Villains and the Meta Liberation Army that takes place in Deika City where she copies Uravity's abilities and uses them on Curious and those with her.

  / 
 
 An Inuit-like member of the Meta Liberation Army whose Quirk  allows him to freely control all nearby ice. Geten is a loyal warrior of the Meta Liberation Army and is a devout believer in its principles. He feels greatly indebted and thankful to Re-Destro for granting him more power and desires to create a world where the strongest superpowers stand at the top of the hierarchy. During the war between the League of Villains and the Meta Liberation Army, Geten faces off against Dabi and fights the latter to a stalemate. He is later defeated by Cementoss during the Jaku Hospital Raid and imprisoned for his crimes.

  / 
 
 A minor hero who possesses an unnamed sliding Quirk and works as a double agent for the Meta Liberation Army. Tatsuyuki is fiercely loyal to his superiors and in that part, he is strict with others for not showing proper etiquette. This was shown when he chastised Hawks for not notifying them of his leave, stating that he is a higher rank than him within the Liberation Army, only to back down when confronted by Skeptic. During the Jaku Hospital Raid, he is exposed by Death Arms and imprisoned for his crimes.

Shie Hassaikai
The  (lit. "Eight Precepts of Death") is a Yakuza group that intends on bringing themselves back to power by producing and dealing Quirk-destroying drugs on the black market. It is one of many Yakuza groups that ran the criminal underworld in Japan. A man known only as "The Boss" originally lead this organization and raised Kai Chisaki into it. His generation fell from prominence during the rise of All Might and Heroes. The Yakuza were pushed into the shadows and lived under constant surveillance. They also serve as the titular main antagonists of the Shie Hassaikai Arc.

 
 
 The unnamed former crime boss of the Shie Hassaikai, Overhaul's foster father, and Eri's maternal grandfather. After refusing to consent to Overhaul's inhumane master plan to bring the Yakuza back to power through a Quirk-destroying drug and serum which completely reverts the effect manufactured from unethical experiments performed on Eri, he is secretly put into a comatose state by Overhaul. Overhaul intended to revive the Boss after using his position as the new head of the Shie Hassaikai to realize his goals. But that becomes impossible after the League of Villains mutilated Overhaul's arms to render him unable to restore his leader. Overhaul later escapes Tartarus so he can visit his former leader and beg for his forgiveness. Overhaul realizes that Eri can restore him.

  / 
 
 The mysophobic and sociopathic crime boss of the Shie Hassaikai. His Quirk  enables him to disassemble anything he touches, as well as reassemble it in any configuration he desires. He can also use his Quirk to fuse himself with others, which enables him to use their Quirks, and heal himself of any injuries he sustains in combat. As a child, Overhaul was recognized as trouble and tries to hone himself into an honorable Yakuza. He is obsessed with restoring the Yakuza to their former glory and attempts to make his objectives reality by creating a Quirk-destroying drug and serum that completely reverts that drug's effect from Eri's body and then monopolizing it on the black market. But he was defeated by Deku before he could commercialize the drug with Eri rescued from him, sentenced to Tartarus for his crimes. The League of Villains, having sabotaged the Shie Hassaikai to avenge Magne, intercept Overhaul's prison transport and destroy Overhaul's hands so that he cannot use his Quirk again. Escaping during the Tartarus breakout, Overhaul becomes Lady Nagant's partner in leading her to Deku in return to be taken to see the former Shie Hassakai boss so he can beg for his forgiveness. After being captured and realizing that Eri can restore the boss in his stead, Overhaul agrees to Deku's conditions of seeking the girl's forgiveness for visitation rights.

  / 
 
 Overhaul's childhood friend and loyal personal assistant. His Quirk  enables him to slow down the movements of anything he hits with his clock-hand-like hair. Hari is a composed and cold-hearted individual, as shown when he was unfazed that Overhaul kills a fellow subordinate, and does not have objections to Eri's inhumane treatment. Being Overhaul's assistant, he is very loyal to his leader. During the Shie Hassaikai Raid, he is defeated by Suneater and arrested by the police.

  / 
 
 The general manager of the Shie Hassaikai. His Quirk  allows him to transfer his own body and mind into solid objects, which he can then manipulate and control like his actual body. He generally uses his Quirk to disguise himself as black beaked hand puppet. Like all of the members of the Shie Hassaikai group, Joi is loyal to Overhaul although he became enraged whenever people show disrespectful or threatening behavior towards his boss. He is hot-tempered and easily lets his emotions run wild, even if it costs him his stealth advantage. During the Shie Hassaikai Raid, he is defeated by Deku and Eraser Head, and taken into police custody.

Eight Bullets
The  are Overhaul's eight elite henchman. Most of them were cast out by society and had no reason to live until they were given a purpose by Overhaul. Ironically, despite the fact that they are fiercely loyal to him, Overhaul regards the Eight Bullets as expendable pawns and only sees them for their utilitarian value to his cause.

 
 
 A former con artist whose Quirk  enables him to force people to answer his questions truthfully. He became disillusioned with society when he could not find someone worthy of his trust and joined the Hassaikai upon realizing Overhaul's villainous but honest intentions. During the Shie Hassaikai Raid, he is defeated by Lemillion and arrested by the police.

 
 
 A hulking gangster whose Quirk  allows him to absorb the stamina of his adversaries, simultaneously strengthening himself and weakening his opponents. During the Shie Hassaikai Raid, he is defeated by the combined efforts of Nejire, Uravity, Froppy, and Ryukyu, and arrested by the police.

 
 
 A fanatic villain whose Quirk  allows him to telekinetically steal any objects that his target possesses. The objects that can be "stolen" include even manifestations of others' Quirks. He joined the Hassaikai after losing everything he had to a traitorous lover and being put in tremendous debt. During the Shie Hassaikai Raid, he is defeated by Suneater and arrested by the police.

 
 
 A masked villain whose Quirk  allows him to grow sharp, durable crystals all over his body. He joined the Hassaikai after being beaten to the brink of death by a former colleague and discarded on the streets. During the Shie Hassaikai Raid, he is defeated by Suneater and arrested by the police.

 
 
 An insane villain who is obsessed with eating. His Quirk  allows his teeth to easily chew through and consume any solid substance, no matter how durable it is. Soramitsu appears to be insane. He is always hungry and thus obsessed with eating. He joined the Hassaikai after being spurned by society and tossed aside for his abnormal personality. During the Shie Hassaikai Raid, he is defeated by Suneater and arrested by the police.

  / 
 
 A battle-crazed villain who thrives on bloodshed and only cares about seeking a battle that can satisfy him. His Quirk  enables him to rotate his shoulders at extreme speeds, allowing him to attack his targets with a near-endless barrage of bullet punches. Kendo is a very hot-blooded man who thrives on violence and bloodshed. He has a warrior-like mentality and all he cares about is seeking out a battle that can satisfy him. He believe that it is unbecoming for a fighter to use weapons and that everyone should fight with the power of their bodies. He joined the Hassaikai after being easily defeated by Overhaul in a fight. Since then, he has followed Overhaul's orders but has no loyalty to him. During the Shie Hassaikai Raid, he is defeated by Red Riot and Fat Gum who allowed them to recover and arrested by the police.

 
 
 A monk-like villain whose Quirk  allows him to create a dome-shaped forcefield around himself and his allies. Hekiji is used to be a devout Buddhist. He is recruited by Overhaul after that Kendo Rappa's tendency to challenge people to fights was obnoxious. During the Shie Hassaikai Raid, he is defeated by Red Riot and Fat Gum and arrested by the police.

 
 
 An alcoholic villain whose Quirk  enables him to subject anyone near him to severe dizziness, knocking off their sense of balance and putting them in a state similar to being drunk. Befitting his Quirk, Deidoro seems to be an alcoholic, as he keeps drinking even while talking or engaging his enemy, letting the alcohol run down his body. Although he is rather energetic, he is shown to be angry easily. During the Shie Hassaikai Raid, he is defeated by Lemillion and arrested by the police.

Humarise
 is a global cult and the main villains of My Hero Academia: World Heroes' Mission. They seek to eliminate Quirks from the world to avert the catastrophe foretold in the Quirk Singularity Doomsday Theory.

 
 
 The main antagonist of My Hero Academia: World Heroes' Mission and the leader of Humarise. His Quirk  enables him to reflect all types of energy, including any attack and its effects, back to the user; as well as storing it for later. He was defeated by Deku and later arrested by the police.

 
 
 A member of Humarise in My Hero Academia: World Heroes' Mission. Her Quirk  allows her to morph her left hand into a bow, as well as being able to control the object she shoots out of it. However, she cannot create her own ammunition. After Sidero's defeat, Beros jumped into a chasm. It is unknown if she is dead or not.

 
 
 A member of Humarise in My Hero Academia: World Heroes' Mission. His Quirk  allows him to create iron balls (of which he can also control the size of, to an extent) and shoot them from his knuckles. Sidero was incapacitated by Shoto's ice attack.

 
 
 A villain duo made up of two twin brothers -  and  - who are members of Humarise in My Hero Academia: World Heroes' Mission. Their Quirk  allows each of them to manifest flexible swords from their arms and shoulders. Both of them are defeated by Bakugo.

 
 
 A member of Humarise in My Hero Academia: World Heroes' Mission. His Quirk  allows him to create a powerful water current twist from his fingertips and horns. When Leviathan takes Trigger, he resembles a hulking gray-skinned humanoid with parts of him being red. He was defeated by Shoto.

 
 
 A member of Humarise in My Hero Academia: World Heroes' Mission. His Quirk  enables him to transform into an Oni-like creature where his arms can transform into spiked clubs. Rogone was defeated by Deku.

 
 
 A researcher and member of Humarise in My Hero Academia: World Heroes' Mission. While he was forced to join Humarise and develop the Trigger Bombs, he had escaped from the organization in order to get the deactivation key created by his colleague Eddie Soul at the cost of his life to the right people as to stop the cult's genocidal plan to eradicate Quirk users in around the world.

Villain Factory

The  is a separate villain group in My Hero Academia: Vigilantes created by All For One. It is responsible for distributing illegal Quirk-enhancing drugs and turning innocent victims into Instant Villains.

 
 The main antagonist of the prequel manga series My Hero Academia: Vigilantes and a member of the Villain Factory. All For One bestowed upon him the Quirks Overlock, Self-Detonation, Radio Waves, Regeneration, and Bombify. Number 6 is responsible for a number actions that occurred throughout the series, including turning Kazuho Haneyama into the second Queen Bee after she politely reject his affection towards her, causing him to develop a personal rivalry towards the Crawler. In the finale, he blows himself up in a fit of rage, having been unable to kill the Crawler.

Other villains
The following villains are not associated with any of the villain groups above:

  / 
 
Izuku and Shoto defeated him, and was later imprisoned in Tartarus. In the aftermath of Paranormal Liberation War, Stain escaped during All For One's Nomu attack on the prison with a data disk regarding Tartarus' security records. Stain presents the disk to All Might a month later helping the former hero realize the legacy he made with others.

  / 
 
 A villain who commits crimes for fame through posting video recordings of his criminal acts. His Quirk  allows him to bestow the property of elasticity to anything he touches. When he was a teenager, Danjuro wanted to be a hero whose name would go down in history and be in the textbooks, and so he enrolled into an unnamed high school with a Hero course. However, his grades were terrible, was repeating years at the high school which was not highly regarded, and failed the Provisional Hero License Exam four times. His dream of becoming a hero came to an end after he was expelled from school for interfering with a Pro-Hero's work, received a strike from the Police Force, got disowned by his parents from the lawsuit filed by the family of the injured window washer that put them in deep debt, and seeing his old classmate Takeshita becoming a successful Pro Hero while not remembering Danjuro. Danjuro has little to no interest in money or objects of value. Instead, he chases after fame and reputation, which he tries to achieve through video recordings of his criminal acts. He and La Brava are defeated by Deku and handed over to the police where Gentle Criminal was interrogated by Gori.

  / 
 
 La Brava is Gentle's loyal fan and admirer, who films and uploads his criminal activities online. Her Quirk  allows her to boost the power of whomever she loves the most by declaring her love to them (although she is only able to activate her Quirk once a day). In her younger age, La Brava has a sensitive of rejection after her crush rejected the love letter and had fallen into a deep depression where she became a withdrawn shut-in who had no aspirations, spending every day glued to her computer and even contemplating suicide. However, her hope and energy was restored after seeing Danjuro's videos, and wanted to help and accompany him even with the acts of doing so making her a criminal as well. She and Gentle are defeated by Deku and handed over to the police where La Brava was interrogated by two detectives.

 
 
 A villain who attacks Endeavor while he is interning Midoriya, Bakugo, and Todoroki. His Quirk  allows him to control and manipulate any lane lines that are painted on the road. Ending is a mentally-ill individual with a noticeable infatuation towards Endeavor. He is completely suicidal whilst disregarding of other peoples' lives if it served to provoke Endeavor into killing him. He is defeated by the Endeavor Agency trainees and later arrested by the police.

  / 
 
 A former hero who worked as an assassin for the Public Safety Commission, killing both villains and corrupt heroes. Her Quirk  grants her the ability to transform her right forearm into a rifle at will. She uses her hair to create ammunition. Kaina is a serious and disciplined woman who does not hesitate to hurt people to fulfill her mission or achieve her goals. She can be very casual and rather fearless, showing no visible fear upon meeting All For One and even addressing him in a familiar way. Disillusioned with the hero society, she attacks the Public Safety president, causing her to be sent to Tartarus. During the Tartarus Break-in, she escaped, helping Kai Chisaki in the process. She then was sent by All for One to capture Izuku Midoriya, receiving an Air Walk Quirk as payment.

 
 
 Wolfram is the main antagonist of My Hero Academia: Two Heroes who was an old acquaintance of All For One and the boss of Swordkill, Daigo, and Nobu. His Quirk  enables him to reshape and manipulate all types of metal. All For One also gave Wolfram the Quirk,  that enables him to increase his muscle mass. He and his group attacked I-Island where the I-Expo was being held. Wolfram was defeated by Izuku and All Might, and likely he was arrested by the police.

 
 
 The main antagonist of My Hero Academia: Heroes Rising and the boss of Chimera, Mummy, and Slice, seeking to create a new world order where those with strong Quirks rule over the weak. While his Quirk  allows him to control the weather, its use gradually causes cellular damage. Nine sought out Dr. Kyudai Garaki to modify his body, receiving a copy of All For One's Quirk in the process. While the operation only worsened Nine's condition, forcing him to wear a special life-support system that pumps special drugs in him, he proceeds to track down someone with a Quirk that can repair his body. This leads him to target the Shimano family, only to be defeated by Deku and a One For All-powered Bakugo before being killed by Tomura.

Other Hero Schools

Shiketsu High School
The primary rival of U.A. High School,  is regarded as the top hero school in West Japan. Shiketsu has very strict regulations compared to those of U.A., taking on a more militaristic environment. During the Dark Hero Arc, it is revealed that Shiketsu High School became connected with U.A. to help provide security and also established a protocol in light of the actions caused by Himiko Toga.

  / 
 
 A first-year student whose Quirk  allows him to control the wind. He was the top-recommended student for U.A. High School but he withdrawn his application. Inasa is an energetic, hyperactive, and enthusiastic young man who expresses himself with vigor. He is loud and can come off as obnoxious but he is oddly polite and speaks very formally most of the time. Inasa claimed that there is almost nothing that he dislikes, and growing up as a kid he enjoyed everything, even bugs. He has a habit of approaching strangers to try and make friends with them. Sometimes, he gets worked up that he'll start talking emphatically about being passionate, and the person or people he's talking to tend to get confused. He developed a rivalry with Todoroki at first which was caused from a moment in his childhood where Endeavor denied him an autograph. However, he was shown to be apologized to Shoto after the Provisional Hero License Exam and despite admitting that he still hated him, Inasa was truly sincere, showing that his hatred of Shoto had at least toned down some. In the Remedial Course Arc, the relationship between the two appears to be improved quite a bit, although their differing personalities and tastes still clash every so often.

  / 
 
 A second-year student whose Quirk  allows her to create illusions that form with a mist-like substance that she emits from her mouth. Camie comes off as less serious than most of her Shiketsu peers, easily brushing off that she had been targeted by the League of Villains who impersonated her to infiltrate the Provisional Hero License Exam. Seiji Shishikura believes that she is an utter fool, but their teacher describes her as simply being bubbly. She is very laid back, straightforward, and tends to be quite talkative. While she appears to be naïve on a fault, Camie is rather clever in hindsight. During the remedial course, she brought up the idea of the remedial students using their Quirks to impress the children rather than fighting violence with violence. She is also truthful and to a point, insightful, telling Katsuki Bakugo that he does well when putting his loud and aggressive attitude aside.

  / 
 
 A second-year student whose Quirk  allows him to mold others into restrained globs of flesh. Seiji is a proud and dignified individual who values Shiketsu's teachings about obligation and dignity above all else. He often stands with his arms behind his back and uses eloquent language when speaking, which causes people to refer to him as "Senpai". He has a lot of respect for U.A. High School, but he believes that the students of Class 1-A sully its image because they lack dignity. He dislikes Katsuki Bakugo especially and lectured him several times during their fight about how Katsuki needs to reflect on how he represents U.A. High with his actions.

  / 
 
 A second-year student and class representative from Shiketsu High whose Quirk  allows him to lengthen and manipulate his body hair. Unlike Inasa Yoarashi and Seiji Shishikura, Nagamasa has a far more polite and reasonable personality and is willing to build a good relationship with Class 1-A. As a class representative, he has a very strict standards and will reprimand hostile or reckless behavior on the part of his fellow classmates. He values Shiketsu's reputation greatly and will not tolerate others shaming it.

Ketsubutsu Academy
 is a high-ranking hero academy that claims a rivalry with U.A. High School, although it is much more one-sided than the rivalry between Shiketsu and U.A. High. Ms. Joke is the school's teacher, making it the only other school to have their staff named.

  / 
 
 A third-year student at Ketsubutsu Academy whose Quirk  allows him to channel powerful vibrations through any surface he touches with his hands. Yo appears to be a polite and friendly individual at first glance. He gives others the benefit of the doubt and believes they have strong hearts. However, this is a façade that he puts on so that others will let their guard down. Preferring to be tactful, he is a natural leader and a talented strategist who can remain calm and rational in chaotic situations, and although he is very competitive, he appears to respect the effort put in by his competitors. Even so, he's not afraid to exploit their weaknesses for his own gain. During the Dark Hero Arc, Yo was pinned down by Muscular and is seemingly about to be killed, until he was rescued by the masked figure who is none other than Izuku Midoriya. The former regains consciousness and think about how the masked figure looked similar to a kid that he met at Provisional Hero License Exam, but feels a different vibe from him, wondering if they are the same person.

  / 
 
 A third-year student at Ketsubutsu Academy who is a fan of U.A. Her Quirk  allows her to retract her body into herself like a turtle. Described as cheerful with social personality, Tatami follows Class 1-A and was not ashamed of asking her rival students for an autograph. She appears to show some like on her classmates and work together for them. However, during the Dark Hero Arc, she can be a fault-finding; a trait that is witnessed after Yo Shindo fails at persuading a group of civilians to evacuate to a safe area.

  / 
 
 A third-year student at Ketsubutsu Academy with an odd appearance due to his blue rock-like skin. His Quirk  allows him to make any object he rubs or kneads with his hands extremely hard, although it does not work on living beings. Like his classmates, Shikkui works hard to become a hero and believes in the strength of his class.

  / 
 
 A student whose Quirk  grants him the ability to throw objects with incredible accuracy and change their trajectory in mid-air. Despite his shy personality, Itejiro is confident for his own abilities and tries to maintain a certain level of grace in his performances.

Seiai Academy
 is an all-girls hero academy that is exclusive to the anime.

 
 
 A second-year student at Seiai Academy, Saiko Intelli is exclusive to the anime and does not appear in the manga. Her Quirk, allows her to temporarily boost her intelligence by drinking tea and closing her eyes. The strength of the intelligence boost depends on the type of tea she drinks. Although Saiko is intelligent, it has been shown that she was not able to predict or comprehend emotion-driven actions (EQ) as shown when she questioned why Tsuyu, Mezo and Kyoka had come back to rescue Momo, when it could have likely been that their friend had already been eliminated; they should have been worrying about themselves instead.

Isamu Academy High School
 is a hero academy that is exclusive to the anime, featured in the OVA Training of the Dead.

 
 
 An arrogant student whose Quirk  enables him to create a gas that temporarily turns those who inhale it into zombies. However, he is not immune to his own Quirk. Similar to Katsuki Bakugo, Romero was shown to be gruff and unkind, while also being arrogant and reckless with his own abilities. Like many of the other students, he also idolizes All Might. He has a condescending demeanor and shows to look down on Class 1-A, as he tells his peers to not be friendly with them.

  / 
 
 A class representative from Isamu Academy. Her unnamed Quirk allows her to create a holographic page which can be used to locate and detect people. Kashiko shares a personality with Momo Yaoyorozu, where she is also very responsible and has great leadership skills.

  / 
 
 A timid boy whose unnamed Quirk enables his sweat to create a bright flash of light and sound on impact.

 
 A friend of Tsuyu Asui from their middle school days who sports the head and neck of a snake. Her unnamed Quirk allows her to paralyze her targets for three seconds by looking them straight in the eye. She also appeared in the first bonus chapter of the manga.

Other characters

Civilians
 
 
 Izuku's mother. Initially supportive of her son's dreams, the constant villain attacks on U.A. make her briefly doubt the safety of the school. Her unnamed Quirk allows her to draw small objects to her with telekinesis-like power.

 
 
 A young boy who lost his Hero parents the Water Hose duo to Muscular and was taken in by the Pussycats due to Mandalay being his aunt. His Quirk  allows him to release a splash of water from his hands. His Quirk appears to be somewhat weak, but that is likely due to his young age.

 
 
 Exclusive to the anime, Taneo Tokuda is a freelance journalist who sought out All Might's successor for personal reasons. His Quirk  allows him to manifest camera lenses on any part of his body and print the photographs from his chest.

 
 
 The young granddaughter of the Shie Hassaikai's former crime boss. She was abused and experimented on by Overhaul to create the Quirk-destroying drug that he planned to use to bring the Yakuza back to power and developed a deep fear of him as a consequence. After she is saved by Deku and Lemillion, she is taken in by the teachers at U.A. and eventually adjusts to normal life, becoming a much more cheerful and optimistic child as a result. Her Quirk  enables her to reverse a living individual's body back to a previous state, allowing her to make them younger, heal them of their injuries, and undo any of their bodily modifications.

 
 
 Endeavor's wife and the mother of their four children. She has a powerful ice Quirk that has yet to be shown in-series. Although their relationship was actually quite healthy during the early years of their marriage, it started to sour when Endeavor lost himself in his obsession to surpass All Might. The abuse he put her through also caused Rei to become mentally unstable and she eventually snapped by throwing boiling water over the left side of Shoto's face in a fit of madness, prompting an unsympathetic Endeavor to send her to a mental hospital. Currently, Rei still resides in that same hospital. She has recovered her sanity and returned to her normal self. Rei also maintains loving relationships with her children and has come to look past her husband's faults as she is aware of his attempts to face his past and atone for his mistakes. Rei was among those who found out that Dabi was her long-lost son Toya and is later released from the hospital where she joins up with her kids. When encountered by Hawks and Best Jeanist, Rei apologized for what Dabi's fire attack did to Hawks.

 
 
 Shoto's older sister. She works as an elementary school teacher and has an ice Quirk like her mother. As noted by Bakugo, she is also an excellent chef. Out of all of Enji's children, she is the only one who has forgiven her father for his mistakes and supports his attempts to atone and mend his relationships with his family. Fuyumi was among those who learned that Dabi is her long-lost brother Toya.

 
 
 Shoto's older brother. He is a university student majoring in medicine and has an ice Quirk like his mother. Unlike his sister, Natsuo openly resents his father for his abuse toward his mother and causing Toya's apparent death and has a hard time even talking to him without losing his composure even when Endeavor saved him from Ending. Natsuo was among those who learned that Dabi is his long-lost brother Toya and was gravely shocked at this revelation. While holding his father accountable for Toya's descent into villainy, Natsuo does blame himself for not speaking against his father from the start or else Toya would not have become a villain.

 
 
 Endeavor's loyal fan. He is a plain-looking young man who looks somewhat similar to Kosei Tsuburaba. Hiroshi is rather supportive of Endeavor, notably when he spoke out to the public that they still need to believe in Endeavor for protecting society from powerful villains like High-End.

 
 
 Appearing in My Hero Academia: Two Heroes, David Shield is a scientist at I-Island, All Might's old friend, and the father of Melissa Shield.

 
 
 Appearing in My Hero Academia: Two Heroes, Melissa is the Quirkless daughter of David Shield who bonds with Izuku.

 
 
 A little boy living on Nabu Island who befriends Deku and the students. His Quirk  allows its user to activate the cells in anyone's body through touch which increases regeneration, recovery time, and improve their physical condition. Katsuma's Quirk is sought out by Nine in the movie My Hero Academia: Heroes Rising. Unlike his sister Mahoro, he has an admiration of Heroes and openly wears an enamel pin of Edgeshot on the front of his satchel along with dreaming of growing up to become a hero himself in one day.

 
 
 A little girl living on Nabu Island who is Katsuma's older sister. Her Quirk  allows her to create holograms of anything she wishes. She is also a character in the movie My Hero Academia: Heroes Rising. Mahoro is a stubborn girl who is quickly to judge others. She appears to be proved that the heroes are not as great as they appear to be. However, after she and her brother was rescued by Izuku, she begins to acknowledge on how great the heroes can be.

 
 
 A character introduced in My Hero Academia: World Heroes' Mission. His Quirk  manifests as a small, bird-like animal named , who changes facial expressions based on how Rody is feeling due to a link to his soul. Rody is also a resident of Otheon.

 
 
 A small, bird-like animal who changes facial expressions based on how Rody is feeling due to a link to his soul.

Police Force
The Police Force is responsible for working alongside the Pro-Heroes, conducting investigations, and arresting the defeated bad guys.

 
 
 The chief of police whose unnamed Quirk gives him the head of a beagle.

  / 
 
 Tsukauchi is a detective who is All Might's client in the Police Force, therefore knowing of his and Izuku's Quirk. He is also a regular recurring character in the prequel series My Hero Academia: Vigilantes, where it is revealed that he is the older brother of Makoto Tsukauchi who is Captain Celebrity's business manager, though their differing views towards the Naruhata Vigilantes had caused issues between them.

 
 
 A member of the Police Force whose unnamed Quirk gives him the head of a tabby cat.

 
 A member of the Police Force whose unnamed Quirk gives him the head of a mountain gorilla. He was the one who interrogated Gentle Criminal. During the Final War Arc, Gori was outside Dr. Kyudai's cell when he mentions to Gori about how All For One first met Dabi. Gori's name was revealed in My Hero Academia: Ultra Analysis: The Official Character Guide.

Past Users of One for All
 
 
 The first user of One For All and sickly younger brother of All For One. He was initially believed to have been born Quirkless, but in reality, he once had a Quirk called Quirk Bestowal, which had no other ability than to transfer itself to another person through their DNA. After his brother forcibly gave Yoichi a power stockpiling Quirk, it merged with the Quirk that he already had, resulting in the creation of One For All.

 
 
 The fourth user of One For All, he was a white-haired man with a long scar running down the left side of his face. Unlike the other users who came before him, he opted to hide from All For One and train with One For All in order to make the Quirk as strong as he possibly could. He ultimately died 18 years after inheriting One For All as a result of his body being unable to withstand the stress of using multiple Quirks for long periods of time.

  / 
 
 The fifth user of One For All, he was a muscular, bald man with a funky and energetic personality. During the time that he possessed One For All, All For One attempted to steal it from him twice, but failed on both attempts. He first appeared during the Joint Training Battle as a spirit inside One For All in order to give Izuku instructions on how to use his Quirk.

 
 
 The sixth user of One For All, he was a quiet, dark-haired man who wore a high-collared jacket that covered his mouth and nose.

 
 
 The seventh user of One For All and Tenko Shimura's grandmother, she was a beautiful and compassionate woman with a strong sense of justice. She was also All Might's master and died protecting him from All For One when the villain attempted to kill them both.

Vigilantes
  / 
 A 19–year old college student whose Quirk  allows him to quickly travel across any flat surface. However, he must make contact with the surface in at least three places (typically he chooses both of his hands and one or both of his feet). He became a vigilante after being unable to become a Pro Hero. During the finale following his final battle with Number 6, his friend Captain Celebrity vouches for him by claiming him as a sidekick. Since then, Koichi had moved to America and joined CC's company in New York under a new codename Skycrawler while trying to win over public support due to his previous status as a wanted outlaw in Japan.

  / 
 A high schooler whose Quirk  allows her to jump several meters high. She was briefly possessed by a villain known as Queen Bee, though she is saved from possession after she is shot through the chest, becoming heavily injured but alive.

  / 
 An old man who is investigating the trafficking of a mysterious drug around town in order to find his daughter. His tenacity in battle makes others believe he possesses a Quirk related to physical prowess, when he actually has no Quirk at all. He was later revealed to formerly have been the former hero O'Clock whose Quirk  had been stolen by All-For-One  and had been given to Number 6. In the finale, he continues his work as a lone vigilante in Naruhata.

References

My Hero Academia manga
My Hero Academia manga volumes by Kōhei Horikoshi. Original Japanese version published by Shueisha. English version by Viz Media.

My Hero Academia anime
My Hero Academia anime television series episodes directed by Kenji Nagasaki, Tomo Ōkubo and Masahiro Mukai. Original Japanese version produced by Bones. English adaptation by Funimation.

  Episode 1: 
  Episode 2: 
  Episode 3: 
  Episode 4: 
  Episode 5: 
  Episode 6: 
  Episode 9: 
  Episode 13: 
  Episode 17: 
  Episode 18: 
  Episode 21: 
  Episode 22: 
  Episode 23: 
  Episode 24: 
  Episode 26: 
  Episode 30: 
  Episode 31: 
  Episode 33: 
  Episode 35: 
  Episode 36: 
  Episode 37: 
  Episode 40: 
  Episode 41: 
  Episode 42: 
  Episode 46: 
  Episode 49: 
  Episode 51: 
  Episode 54: 
  Episode 57: 
  Episode 62: 
  Episode 63: 
  Episode 64: 
  Episode 67: 
  Episode 71: 
  Episode 75: 
  Episode 79: 
  Episode 80: 
  Episode 83: 
  Episode 87: 
  Episode 90: 
  Episode 92: 
  Episode 93: 
  Episode 95: 
  Episode 96: 
  Episode 97: 
  Episode 100: 
  Episode 101: 
  Episode 108: 
  Episode 109: 
  Episode 111: 
  Episode 112:

Other My Hero Academia media
   – English translation. Originally published in 2016 as 244 original pages in Japanese version.
   – English translation. Originally published in 2017 as 228 original pages in Japanese version.
   – English translation. Originally published in 2018 as 244 original pages in Japanese version.
   – English translation. Originally published in 2019 as 244 original pages in Japanese version.
   – English translation. Originally published in 2020 as 260 original pages in Japanese version.
   – English translation. Originally published in 2019 as 4 additional pages in Japanese version.
   – English translation. Originally published in 2017 as 4 volumes in Japanese version.

Other sources

My Hero Academia
My Hero Academia
Superhero school students
Superhero schoolteachers
Lists of superheroes
Lists of supervillains